

109001–109100 

|-bgcolor=#E9E9E9
| 109001 ||  || — || August 11, 2001 || Haleakala || NEAT || RAF || align=right | 1.7 km || 
|-id=002 bgcolor=#fefefe
| 109002 ||  || — || August 13, 2001 || Haleakala || NEAT || V || align=right | 1.2 km || 
|-id=003 bgcolor=#fefefe
| 109003 ||  || — || August 15, 2001 || Haleakala || NEAT || NYS || align=right data-sort-value="0.96" | 960 m || 
|-id=004 bgcolor=#E9E9E9
| 109004 ||  || — || August 15, 2001 || Haleakala || NEAT || — || align=right | 4.5 km || 
|-id=005 bgcolor=#d6d6d6
| 109005 ||  || — || August 16, 2001 || Socorro || LINEAR || EOS || align=right | 4.5 km || 
|-id=006 bgcolor=#E9E9E9
| 109006 ||  || — || August 16, 2001 || Socorro || LINEAR || — || align=right | 1.7 km || 
|-id=007 bgcolor=#E9E9E9
| 109007 ||  || — || August 17, 2001 || Reedy Creek || J. Broughton || — || align=right | 2.9 km || 
|-id=008 bgcolor=#fefefe
| 109008 ||  || — || August 17, 2001 || Reedy Creek || J. Broughton || FLO || align=right | 1.6 km || 
|-id=009 bgcolor=#fefefe
| 109009 ||  || — || August 16, 2001 || Socorro || LINEAR || NYS || align=right | 1.7 km || 
|-id=010 bgcolor=#fefefe
| 109010 ||  || — || August 16, 2001 || Socorro || LINEAR || V || align=right | 1.1 km || 
|-id=011 bgcolor=#fefefe
| 109011 ||  || — || August 16, 2001 || Socorro || LINEAR || — || align=right | 2.2 km || 
|-id=012 bgcolor=#E9E9E9
| 109012 ||  || — || August 16, 2001 || Socorro || LINEAR || NEM || align=right | 5.4 km || 
|-id=013 bgcolor=#d6d6d6
| 109013 ||  || — || August 16, 2001 || Socorro || LINEAR || — || align=right | 5.7 km || 
|-id=014 bgcolor=#fefefe
| 109014 ||  || — || August 16, 2001 || Socorro || LINEAR || NYS || align=right | 1.1 km || 
|-id=015 bgcolor=#E9E9E9
| 109015 ||  || — || August 16, 2001 || Socorro || LINEAR || — || align=right | 2.6 km || 
|-id=016 bgcolor=#E9E9E9
| 109016 ||  || — || August 16, 2001 || Socorro || LINEAR || — || align=right | 1.9 km || 
|-id=017 bgcolor=#fefefe
| 109017 ||  || — || August 16, 2001 || Socorro || LINEAR || V || align=right | 1.1 km || 
|-id=018 bgcolor=#fefefe
| 109018 ||  || — || August 16, 2001 || Socorro || LINEAR || — || align=right | 2.0 km || 
|-id=019 bgcolor=#fefefe
| 109019 ||  || — || August 16, 2001 || Socorro || LINEAR || SUL || align=right | 4.8 km || 
|-id=020 bgcolor=#E9E9E9
| 109020 ||  || — || August 16, 2001 || Socorro || LINEAR || — || align=right | 3.0 km || 
|-id=021 bgcolor=#fefefe
| 109021 ||  || — || August 16, 2001 || Socorro || LINEAR || V || align=right | 1.1 km || 
|-id=022 bgcolor=#d6d6d6
| 109022 ||  || — || August 16, 2001 || Socorro || LINEAR || — || align=right | 4.8 km || 
|-id=023 bgcolor=#d6d6d6
| 109023 ||  || — || August 16, 2001 || Socorro || LINEAR || — || align=right | 5.0 km || 
|-id=024 bgcolor=#d6d6d6
| 109024 ||  || — || August 16, 2001 || Socorro || LINEAR || EMA || align=right | 7.7 km || 
|-id=025 bgcolor=#d6d6d6
| 109025 ||  || — || August 16, 2001 || Socorro || LINEAR || — || align=right | 3.2 km || 
|-id=026 bgcolor=#d6d6d6
| 109026 ||  || — || August 16, 2001 || Socorro || LINEAR || HYG || align=right | 7.5 km || 
|-id=027 bgcolor=#E9E9E9
| 109027 ||  || — || August 16, 2001 || Socorro || LINEAR || AEO || align=right | 2.9 km || 
|-id=028 bgcolor=#d6d6d6
| 109028 ||  || — || August 16, 2001 || Socorro || LINEAR || — || align=right | 6.4 km || 
|-id=029 bgcolor=#E9E9E9
| 109029 ||  || — || August 16, 2001 || Socorro || LINEAR || — || align=right | 2.1 km || 
|-id=030 bgcolor=#fefefe
| 109030 ||  || — || August 16, 2001 || Socorro || LINEAR || NYS || align=right | 3.5 km || 
|-id=031 bgcolor=#E9E9E9
| 109031 ||  || — || August 16, 2001 || Socorro || LINEAR || EUN || align=right | 2.4 km || 
|-id=032 bgcolor=#d6d6d6
| 109032 ||  || — || August 16, 2001 || Socorro || LINEAR || — || align=right | 8.0 km || 
|-id=033 bgcolor=#E9E9E9
| 109033 ||  || — || August 16, 2001 || Socorro || LINEAR || — || align=right | 2.1 km || 
|-id=034 bgcolor=#fefefe
| 109034 ||  || — || August 16, 2001 || Socorro || LINEAR || NYS || align=right | 1.5 km || 
|-id=035 bgcolor=#fefefe
| 109035 ||  || — || August 16, 2001 || Socorro || LINEAR || — || align=right | 4.5 km || 
|-id=036 bgcolor=#d6d6d6
| 109036 ||  || — || August 16, 2001 || Socorro || LINEAR || — || align=right | 6.2 km || 
|-id=037 bgcolor=#fefefe
| 109037 ||  || — || August 16, 2001 || Socorro || LINEAR || NYS || align=right | 1.6 km || 
|-id=038 bgcolor=#fefefe
| 109038 ||  || — || August 16, 2001 || Socorro || LINEAR || NYS || align=right | 2.1 km || 
|-id=039 bgcolor=#E9E9E9
| 109039 ||  || — || August 16, 2001 || Socorro || LINEAR || — || align=right | 2.4 km || 
|-id=040 bgcolor=#fefefe
| 109040 ||  || — || August 16, 2001 || Socorro || LINEAR || — || align=right | 1.7 km || 
|-id=041 bgcolor=#fefefe
| 109041 ||  || — || August 16, 2001 || Socorro || LINEAR || — || align=right | 1.7 km || 
|-id=042 bgcolor=#E9E9E9
| 109042 ||  || — || August 16, 2001 || Socorro || LINEAR || — || align=right | 2.3 km || 
|-id=043 bgcolor=#E9E9E9
| 109043 ||  || — || August 16, 2001 || Socorro || LINEAR || — || align=right | 2.5 km || 
|-id=044 bgcolor=#E9E9E9
| 109044 ||  || — || August 16, 2001 || Socorro || LINEAR || — || align=right | 1.8 km || 
|-id=045 bgcolor=#fefefe
| 109045 ||  || — || August 16, 2001 || Socorro || LINEAR || — || align=right | 1.8 km || 
|-id=046 bgcolor=#fefefe
| 109046 ||  || — || August 16, 2001 || Socorro || LINEAR || V || align=right | 1.1 km || 
|-id=047 bgcolor=#fefefe
| 109047 ||  || — || August 16, 2001 || Socorro || LINEAR || V || align=right | 1.5 km || 
|-id=048 bgcolor=#fefefe
| 109048 ||  || — || August 16, 2001 || Socorro || LINEAR || — || align=right | 3.1 km || 
|-id=049 bgcolor=#E9E9E9
| 109049 ||  || — || August 16, 2001 || Socorro || LINEAR || — || align=right | 2.8 km || 
|-id=050 bgcolor=#d6d6d6
| 109050 ||  || — || August 16, 2001 || Socorro || LINEAR || — || align=right | 5.8 km || 
|-id=051 bgcolor=#fefefe
| 109051 ||  || — || August 16, 2001 || Socorro || LINEAR || NYS || align=right | 1.2 km || 
|-id=052 bgcolor=#E9E9E9
| 109052 ||  || — || August 16, 2001 || Socorro || LINEAR || — || align=right | 3.4 km || 
|-id=053 bgcolor=#E9E9E9
| 109053 ||  || — || August 16, 2001 || Socorro || LINEAR || — || align=right | 2.5 km || 
|-id=054 bgcolor=#fefefe
| 109054 ||  || — || August 16, 2001 || Socorro || LINEAR || NYS || align=right | 1.4 km || 
|-id=055 bgcolor=#d6d6d6
| 109055 ||  || — || August 16, 2001 || Socorro || LINEAR || EUP || align=right | 6.1 km || 
|-id=056 bgcolor=#E9E9E9
| 109056 ||  || — || August 16, 2001 || Socorro || LINEAR || — || align=right | 2.3 km || 
|-id=057 bgcolor=#fefefe
| 109057 ||  || — || August 16, 2001 || Socorro || LINEAR || — || align=right | 1.7 km || 
|-id=058 bgcolor=#E9E9E9
| 109058 ||  || — || August 16, 2001 || Socorro || LINEAR || — || align=right | 2.8 km || 
|-id=059 bgcolor=#E9E9E9
| 109059 ||  || — || August 16, 2001 || Socorro || LINEAR || — || align=right | 3.7 km || 
|-id=060 bgcolor=#E9E9E9
| 109060 ||  || — || August 16, 2001 || Socorro || LINEAR || — || align=right | 1.8 km || 
|-id=061 bgcolor=#d6d6d6
| 109061 ||  || — || August 16, 2001 || Socorro || LINEAR || — || align=right | 4.6 km || 
|-id=062 bgcolor=#fefefe
| 109062 ||  || — || August 16, 2001 || Socorro || LINEAR || — || align=right | 1.6 km || 
|-id=063 bgcolor=#E9E9E9
| 109063 ||  || — || August 16, 2001 || Socorro || LINEAR || — || align=right | 4.4 km || 
|-id=064 bgcolor=#d6d6d6
| 109064 ||  || — || August 16, 2001 || Socorro || LINEAR || — || align=right | 11 km || 
|-id=065 bgcolor=#E9E9E9
| 109065 ||  || — || August 16, 2001 || Socorro || LINEAR || — || align=right | 2.6 km || 
|-id=066 bgcolor=#E9E9E9
| 109066 ||  || — || August 16, 2001 || Socorro || LINEAR || — || align=right | 2.9 km || 
|-id=067 bgcolor=#E9E9E9
| 109067 ||  || — || August 16, 2001 || Socorro || LINEAR || MAR || align=right | 2.4 km || 
|-id=068 bgcolor=#E9E9E9
| 109068 ||  || — || August 16, 2001 || Socorro || LINEAR || — || align=right | 2.3 km || 
|-id=069 bgcolor=#fefefe
| 109069 ||  || — || August 16, 2001 || Socorro || LINEAR || V || align=right | 3.2 km || 
|-id=070 bgcolor=#E9E9E9
| 109070 ||  || — || August 16, 2001 || Socorro || LINEAR || — || align=right | 6.6 km || 
|-id=071 bgcolor=#E9E9E9
| 109071 ||  || — || August 16, 2001 || Socorro || LINEAR || — || align=right | 2.5 km || 
|-id=072 bgcolor=#fefefe
| 109072 ||  || — || August 16, 2001 || Socorro || LINEAR || — || align=right | 4.2 km || 
|-id=073 bgcolor=#E9E9E9
| 109073 ||  || — || August 16, 2001 || Socorro || LINEAR || — || align=right | 2.5 km || 
|-id=074 bgcolor=#E9E9E9
| 109074 ||  || — || August 16, 2001 || Socorro || LINEAR || — || align=right | 2.0 km || 
|-id=075 bgcolor=#E9E9E9
| 109075 ||  || — || August 16, 2001 || Socorro || LINEAR || EUN || align=right | 2.3 km || 
|-id=076 bgcolor=#d6d6d6
| 109076 ||  || — || August 16, 2001 || Socorro || LINEAR || — || align=right | 8.6 km || 
|-id=077 bgcolor=#FA8072
| 109077 ||  || — || August 16, 2001 || Socorro || LINEAR || — || align=right | 2.3 km || 
|-id=078 bgcolor=#E9E9E9
| 109078 ||  || — || August 16, 2001 || Socorro || LINEAR || — || align=right | 2.2 km || 
|-id=079 bgcolor=#fefefe
| 109079 ||  || — || August 16, 2001 || Socorro || LINEAR || — || align=right | 3.0 km || 
|-id=080 bgcolor=#fefefe
| 109080 ||  || — || August 16, 2001 || Socorro || LINEAR || — || align=right | 2.0 km || 
|-id=081 bgcolor=#E9E9E9
| 109081 ||  || — || August 16, 2001 || Socorro || LINEAR || — || align=right | 1.8 km || 
|-id=082 bgcolor=#fefefe
| 109082 ||  || — || August 16, 2001 || Socorro || LINEAR || V || align=right | 1.7 km || 
|-id=083 bgcolor=#E9E9E9
| 109083 ||  || — || August 16, 2001 || Socorro || LINEAR || — || align=right | 4.2 km || 
|-id=084 bgcolor=#E9E9E9
| 109084 ||  || — || August 16, 2001 || Socorro || LINEAR || — || align=right | 4.0 km || 
|-id=085 bgcolor=#fefefe
| 109085 ||  || — || August 16, 2001 || Socorro || LINEAR || NYS || align=right | 2.1 km || 
|-id=086 bgcolor=#E9E9E9
| 109086 ||  || — || August 16, 2001 || Socorro || LINEAR || — || align=right | 3.2 km || 
|-id=087 bgcolor=#E9E9E9
| 109087 ||  || — || August 16, 2001 || Socorro || LINEAR || — || align=right | 6.4 km || 
|-id=088 bgcolor=#E9E9E9
| 109088 ||  || — || August 16, 2001 || Socorro || LINEAR || — || align=right | 2.3 km || 
|-id=089 bgcolor=#E9E9E9
| 109089 ||  || — || August 16, 2001 || Socorro || LINEAR || — || align=right | 3.9 km || 
|-id=090 bgcolor=#E9E9E9
| 109090 ||  || — || August 16, 2001 || Socorro || LINEAR || — || align=right | 3.7 km || 
|-id=091 bgcolor=#d6d6d6
| 109091 ||  || — || August 16, 2001 || Socorro || LINEAR || — || align=right | 7.5 km || 
|-id=092 bgcolor=#d6d6d6
| 109092 ||  || — || August 16, 2001 || Socorro || LINEAR || TIR || align=right | 8.2 km || 
|-id=093 bgcolor=#E9E9E9
| 109093 ||  || — || August 16, 2001 || Socorro || LINEAR || — || align=right | 3.2 km || 
|-id=094 bgcolor=#E9E9E9
| 109094 ||  || — || August 16, 2001 || Socorro || LINEAR || — || align=right | 2.2 km || 
|-id=095 bgcolor=#E9E9E9
| 109095 ||  || — || August 17, 2001 || Palomar || NEAT || — || align=right | 1.7 km || 
|-id=096 bgcolor=#d6d6d6
| 109096 ||  || — || August 16, 2001 || Ondřejov || P. Kušnirák, U. Babiaková || — || align=right | 3.3 km || 
|-id=097 bgcolor=#E9E9E9
| 109097 Hamuy ||  ||  || August 19, 2001 || Pla D'Arguines || R. Ferrando || — || align=right | 2.9 km || 
|-id=098 bgcolor=#fefefe
| 109098 ||  || — || August 19, 2001 || Reedy Creek || J. Broughton || — || align=right | 1.8 km || 
|-id=099 bgcolor=#fefefe
| 109099 ||  || — || August 16, 2001 || Socorro || LINEAR || — || align=right | 2.6 km || 
|-id=100 bgcolor=#fefefe
| 109100 ||  || — || August 16, 2001 || Socorro || LINEAR || ERI || align=right | 3.6 km || 
|}

109101–109200 

|-bgcolor=#d6d6d6
| 109101 ||  || — || August 16, 2001 || Socorro || LINEAR || — || align=right | 5.1 km || 
|-id=102 bgcolor=#d6d6d6
| 109102 ||  || — || August 16, 2001 || Socorro || LINEAR || — || align=right | 7.1 km || 
|-id=103 bgcolor=#d6d6d6
| 109103 ||  || — || August 16, 2001 || Socorro || LINEAR || HYG || align=right | 5.3 km || 
|-id=104 bgcolor=#fefefe
| 109104 ||  || — || August 16, 2001 || Socorro || LINEAR || — || align=right | 3.6 km || 
|-id=105 bgcolor=#E9E9E9
| 109105 ||  || — || August 16, 2001 || Socorro || LINEAR || — || align=right | 3.4 km || 
|-id=106 bgcolor=#d6d6d6
| 109106 ||  || — || August 16, 2001 || Socorro || LINEAR || — || align=right | 3.1 km || 
|-id=107 bgcolor=#E9E9E9
| 109107 ||  || — || August 16, 2001 || Socorro || LINEAR || — || align=right | 3.7 km || 
|-id=108 bgcolor=#fefefe
| 109108 ||  || — || August 16, 2001 || Socorro || LINEAR || NYS || align=right | 1.5 km || 
|-id=109 bgcolor=#E9E9E9
| 109109 ||  || — || August 16, 2001 || Socorro || LINEAR || GEF || align=right | 2.3 km || 
|-id=110 bgcolor=#E9E9E9
| 109110 ||  || — || August 16, 2001 || Socorro || LINEAR || — || align=right | 2.4 km || 
|-id=111 bgcolor=#d6d6d6
| 109111 ||  || — || August 16, 2001 || Socorro || LINEAR || URS || align=right | 9.8 km || 
|-id=112 bgcolor=#E9E9E9
| 109112 ||  || — || August 16, 2001 || Socorro || LINEAR || — || align=right | 2.4 km || 
|-id=113 bgcolor=#fefefe
| 109113 ||  || — || August 16, 2001 || Socorro || LINEAR || — || align=right | 1.6 km || 
|-id=114 bgcolor=#d6d6d6
| 109114 ||  || — || August 16, 2001 || Socorro || LINEAR || — || align=right | 7.8 km || 
|-id=115 bgcolor=#fefefe
| 109115 ||  || — || August 16, 2001 || Socorro || LINEAR || NYS || align=right | 1.1 km || 
|-id=116 bgcolor=#fefefe
| 109116 ||  || — || August 16, 2001 || Socorro || LINEAR || — || align=right | 3.0 km || 
|-id=117 bgcolor=#E9E9E9
| 109117 ||  || — || August 16, 2001 || Socorro || LINEAR || — || align=right | 2.2 km || 
|-id=118 bgcolor=#fefefe
| 109118 ||  || — || August 16, 2001 || Socorro || LINEAR || — || align=right | 1.8 km || 
|-id=119 bgcolor=#E9E9E9
| 109119 ||  || — || August 16, 2001 || Socorro || LINEAR || — || align=right | 4.7 km || 
|-id=120 bgcolor=#d6d6d6
| 109120 ||  || — || August 16, 2001 || Socorro || LINEAR || — || align=right | 6.5 km || 
|-id=121 bgcolor=#E9E9E9
| 109121 ||  || — || August 16, 2001 || Socorro || LINEAR || — || align=right | 3.7 km || 
|-id=122 bgcolor=#d6d6d6
| 109122 ||  || — || August 16, 2001 || Socorro || LINEAR || — || align=right | 8.6 km || 
|-id=123 bgcolor=#E9E9E9
| 109123 ||  || — || August 16, 2001 || Socorro || LINEAR || — || align=right | 2.5 km || 
|-id=124 bgcolor=#d6d6d6
| 109124 ||  || — || August 16, 2001 || Socorro || LINEAR || EOS || align=right | 4.3 km || 
|-id=125 bgcolor=#d6d6d6
| 109125 ||  || — || August 16, 2001 || Socorro || LINEAR || EOS || align=right | 4.1 km || 
|-id=126 bgcolor=#d6d6d6
| 109126 ||  || — || August 16, 2001 || Socorro || LINEAR || — || align=right | 5.7 km || 
|-id=127 bgcolor=#E9E9E9
| 109127 ||  || — || August 16, 2001 || Socorro || LINEAR || — || align=right | 1.9 km || 
|-id=128 bgcolor=#E9E9E9
| 109128 ||  || — || August 16, 2001 || Socorro || LINEAR || — || align=right | 2.3 km || 
|-id=129 bgcolor=#fefefe
| 109129 ||  || — || August 16, 2001 || Socorro || LINEAR || V || align=right | 1.9 km || 
|-id=130 bgcolor=#E9E9E9
| 109130 ||  || — || August 16, 2001 || Socorro || LINEAR || — || align=right | 2.2 km || 
|-id=131 bgcolor=#fefefe
| 109131 ||  || — || August 16, 2001 || Socorro || LINEAR || — || align=right | 1.8 km || 
|-id=132 bgcolor=#d6d6d6
| 109132 ||  || — || August 16, 2001 || Socorro || LINEAR || ALA || align=right | 7.0 km || 
|-id=133 bgcolor=#d6d6d6
| 109133 ||  || — || August 16, 2001 || Socorro || LINEAR || THM || align=right | 6.2 km || 
|-id=134 bgcolor=#E9E9E9
| 109134 ||  || — || August 16, 2001 || Socorro || LINEAR || — || align=right | 5.3 km || 
|-id=135 bgcolor=#E9E9E9
| 109135 ||  || — || August 16, 2001 || Socorro || LINEAR || — || align=right | 1.7 km || 
|-id=136 bgcolor=#E9E9E9
| 109136 ||  || — || August 16, 2001 || Socorro || LINEAR || — || align=right | 1.8 km || 
|-id=137 bgcolor=#fefefe
| 109137 ||  || — || August 16, 2001 || Socorro || LINEAR || — || align=right | 1.8 km || 
|-id=138 bgcolor=#E9E9E9
| 109138 ||  || — || August 16, 2001 || Socorro || LINEAR || — || align=right | 1.9 km || 
|-id=139 bgcolor=#E9E9E9
| 109139 ||  || — || August 16, 2001 || Socorro || LINEAR || — || align=right | 2.0 km || 
|-id=140 bgcolor=#E9E9E9
| 109140 ||  || — || August 16, 2001 || Socorro || LINEAR || MAR || align=right | 2.2 km || 
|-id=141 bgcolor=#fefefe
| 109141 ||  || — || August 16, 2001 || Socorro || LINEAR || — || align=right | 1.7 km || 
|-id=142 bgcolor=#fefefe
| 109142 ||  || — || August 16, 2001 || Socorro || LINEAR || NYS || align=right | 1.6 km || 
|-id=143 bgcolor=#fefefe
| 109143 ||  || — || August 16, 2001 || Socorro || LINEAR || — || align=right | 1.7 km || 
|-id=144 bgcolor=#fefefe
| 109144 ||  || — || August 16, 2001 || Socorro || LINEAR || NYS || align=right | 1.3 km || 
|-id=145 bgcolor=#E9E9E9
| 109145 ||  || — || August 16, 2001 || Socorro || LINEAR || — || align=right | 2.0 km || 
|-id=146 bgcolor=#E9E9E9
| 109146 ||  || — || August 16, 2001 || Socorro || LINEAR || — || align=right | 2.9 km || 
|-id=147 bgcolor=#fefefe
| 109147 ||  || — || August 16, 2001 || Socorro || LINEAR || SUL || align=right | 4.1 km || 
|-id=148 bgcolor=#E9E9E9
| 109148 ||  || — || August 16, 2001 || Socorro || LINEAR || — || align=right | 2.1 km || 
|-id=149 bgcolor=#E9E9E9
| 109149 ||  || — || August 16, 2001 || Socorro || LINEAR || MAR || align=right | 3.3 km || 
|-id=150 bgcolor=#fefefe
| 109150 ||  || — || August 17, 2001 || Socorro || LINEAR || — || align=right | 2.0 km || 
|-id=151 bgcolor=#fefefe
| 109151 ||  || — || August 17, 2001 || Socorro || LINEAR || — || align=right | 2.0 km || 
|-id=152 bgcolor=#E9E9E9
| 109152 ||  || — || August 18, 2001 || Socorro || LINEAR || — || align=right | 2.0 km || 
|-id=153 bgcolor=#d6d6d6
| 109153 ||  || — || August 18, 2001 || Socorro || LINEAR || — || align=right | 6.7 km || 
|-id=154 bgcolor=#fefefe
| 109154 ||  || — || August 18, 2001 || Socorro || LINEAR || — || align=right | 1.5 km || 
|-id=155 bgcolor=#d6d6d6
| 109155 ||  || — || August 16, 2001 || Palomar || NEAT || — || align=right | 7.9 km || 
|-id=156 bgcolor=#E9E9E9
| 109156 ||  || — || August 16, 2001 || Socorro || LINEAR || MAR || align=right | 2.1 km || 
|-id=157 bgcolor=#d6d6d6
| 109157 ||  || — || August 17, 2001 || Socorro || LINEAR || — || align=right | 4.7 km || 
|-id=158 bgcolor=#E9E9E9
| 109158 ||  || — || August 16, 2001 || Socorro || LINEAR || — || align=right | 3.8 km || 
|-id=159 bgcolor=#fefefe
| 109159 ||  || — || August 16, 2001 || Socorro || LINEAR || NYS || align=right | 1.6 km || 
|-id=160 bgcolor=#E9E9E9
| 109160 ||  || — || August 16, 2001 || Socorro || LINEAR || — || align=right | 1.8 km || 
|-id=161 bgcolor=#fefefe
| 109161 ||  || — || August 16, 2001 || Socorro || LINEAR || — || align=right | 1.6 km || 
|-id=162 bgcolor=#fefefe
| 109162 ||  || — || August 16, 2001 || Socorro || LINEAR || V || align=right | 1.3 km || 
|-id=163 bgcolor=#E9E9E9
| 109163 ||  || — || August 16, 2001 || Socorro || LINEAR || — || align=right | 2.3 km || 
|-id=164 bgcolor=#fefefe
| 109164 ||  || — || August 16, 2001 || Socorro || LINEAR || — || align=right | 2.1 km || 
|-id=165 bgcolor=#fefefe
| 109165 ||  || — || August 16, 2001 || Socorro || LINEAR || NYS || align=right | 1.4 km || 
|-id=166 bgcolor=#d6d6d6
| 109166 ||  || — || August 16, 2001 || Socorro || LINEAR || — || align=right | 5.3 km || 
|-id=167 bgcolor=#E9E9E9
| 109167 ||  || — || August 16, 2001 || Socorro || LINEAR || — || align=right | 2.3 km || 
|-id=168 bgcolor=#E9E9E9
| 109168 ||  || — || August 16, 2001 || Socorro || LINEAR || — || align=right | 3.3 km || 
|-id=169 bgcolor=#E9E9E9
| 109169 ||  || — || August 16, 2001 || Socorro || LINEAR || MAR || align=right | 3.1 km || 
|-id=170 bgcolor=#E9E9E9
| 109170 ||  || — || August 16, 2001 || Socorro || LINEAR || — || align=right | 2.0 km || 
|-id=171 bgcolor=#E9E9E9
| 109171 ||  || — || August 16, 2001 || Socorro || LINEAR || — || align=right | 2.4 km || 
|-id=172 bgcolor=#E9E9E9
| 109172 ||  || — || August 16, 2001 || Socorro || LINEAR || — || align=right | 4.1 km || 
|-id=173 bgcolor=#E9E9E9
| 109173 ||  || — || August 16, 2001 || Socorro || LINEAR || — || align=right | 4.1 km || 
|-id=174 bgcolor=#E9E9E9
| 109174 ||  || — || August 17, 2001 || Socorro || LINEAR || — || align=right | 2.7 km || 
|-id=175 bgcolor=#E9E9E9
| 109175 ||  || — || August 17, 2001 || Socorro || LINEAR || — || align=right | 1.5 km || 
|-id=176 bgcolor=#E9E9E9
| 109176 ||  || — || August 17, 2001 || Socorro || LINEAR || — || align=right | 4.4 km || 
|-id=177 bgcolor=#fefefe
| 109177 ||  || — || August 17, 2001 || Socorro || LINEAR || V || align=right | 1.9 km || 
|-id=178 bgcolor=#d6d6d6
| 109178 ||  || — || August 17, 2001 || Socorro || LINEAR || — || align=right | 6.9 km || 
|-id=179 bgcolor=#E9E9E9
| 109179 ||  || — || August 18, 2001 || Socorro || LINEAR || — || align=right | 2.0 km || 
|-id=180 bgcolor=#d6d6d6
| 109180 ||  || — || August 18, 2001 || Socorro || LINEAR || — || align=right | 8.4 km || 
|-id=181 bgcolor=#E9E9E9
| 109181 ||  || — || August 19, 2001 || Socorro || LINEAR || — || align=right | 3.6 km || 
|-id=182 bgcolor=#E9E9E9
| 109182 ||  || — || August 19, 2001 || Socorro || LINEAR || — || align=right | 5.7 km || 
|-id=183 bgcolor=#E9E9E9
| 109183 ||  || — || August 20, 2001 || Oakley || C. Wolfe || ADE || align=right | 4.4 km || 
|-id=184 bgcolor=#d6d6d6
| 109184 ||  || — || August 17, 2001 || Socorro || LINEAR || HIL3:2 || align=right | 14 km || 
|-id=185 bgcolor=#fefefe
| 109185 ||  || — || August 17, 2001 || Socorro || LINEAR || — || align=right | 2.1 km || 
|-id=186 bgcolor=#fefefe
| 109186 ||  || — || August 17, 2001 || Socorro || LINEAR || V || align=right | 1.5 km || 
|-id=187 bgcolor=#fefefe
| 109187 ||  || — || August 16, 2001 || Palomar || NEAT || V || align=right | 1.4 km || 
|-id=188 bgcolor=#d6d6d6
| 109188 ||  || — || August 21, 2001 || Desert Eagle || W. K. Y. Yeung || — || align=right | 4.7 km || 
|-id=189 bgcolor=#E9E9E9
| 109189 ||  || — || August 19, 2001 || Haleakala || NEAT || — || align=right | 2.0 km || 
|-id=190 bgcolor=#d6d6d6
| 109190 ||  || — || August 19, 2001 || Socorro || LINEAR || ALA || align=right | 7.1 km || 
|-id=191 bgcolor=#E9E9E9
| 109191 ||  || — || August 16, 2001 || Socorro || LINEAR || — || align=right | 4.0 km || 
|-id=192 bgcolor=#E9E9E9
| 109192 ||  || — || August 16, 2001 || Socorro || LINEAR || — || align=right | 3.3 km || 
|-id=193 bgcolor=#E9E9E9
| 109193 ||  || — || August 16, 2001 || Socorro || LINEAR || — || align=right | 5.0 km || 
|-id=194 bgcolor=#d6d6d6
| 109194 ||  || — || August 16, 2001 || Socorro || LINEAR || — || align=right | 7.7 km || 
|-id=195 bgcolor=#E9E9E9
| 109195 ||  || — || August 16, 2001 || Socorro || LINEAR || HNS || align=right | 3.0 km || 
|-id=196 bgcolor=#E9E9E9
| 109196 ||  || — || August 16, 2001 || Socorro || LINEAR || — || align=right | 2.6 km || 
|-id=197 bgcolor=#E9E9E9
| 109197 ||  || — || August 16, 2001 || Socorro || LINEAR || — || align=right | 3.1 km || 
|-id=198 bgcolor=#E9E9E9
| 109198 ||  || — || August 16, 2001 || Socorro || LINEAR || — || align=right | 3.5 km || 
|-id=199 bgcolor=#E9E9E9
| 109199 ||  || — || August 16, 2001 || Socorro || LINEAR || GEF || align=right | 3.3 km || 
|-id=200 bgcolor=#E9E9E9
| 109200 ||  || — || August 16, 2001 || Socorro || LINEAR || — || align=right | 3.6 km || 
|}

109201–109300 

|-bgcolor=#E9E9E9
| 109201 ||  || — || August 16, 2001 || Socorro || LINEAR || — || align=right | 3.8 km || 
|-id=202 bgcolor=#E9E9E9
| 109202 ||  || — || August 16, 2001 || Socorro || LINEAR || — || align=right | 3.6 km || 
|-id=203 bgcolor=#E9E9E9
| 109203 ||  || — || August 16, 2001 || Socorro || LINEAR || — || align=right | 2.6 km || 
|-id=204 bgcolor=#E9E9E9
| 109204 ||  || — || August 17, 2001 || Socorro || LINEAR || slow || align=right | 3.2 km || 
|-id=205 bgcolor=#fefefe
| 109205 ||  || — || August 17, 2001 || Socorro || LINEAR || — || align=right | 2.1 km || 
|-id=206 bgcolor=#E9E9E9
| 109206 ||  || — || August 17, 2001 || Socorro || LINEAR || MAR || align=right | 2.4 km || 
|-id=207 bgcolor=#d6d6d6
| 109207 ||  || — || August 17, 2001 || Socorro || LINEAR || — || align=right | 6.0 km || 
|-id=208 bgcolor=#E9E9E9
| 109208 ||  || — || August 17, 2001 || Socorro || LINEAR || — || align=right | 3.4 km || 
|-id=209 bgcolor=#E9E9E9
| 109209 ||  || — || August 17, 2001 || Socorro || LINEAR || — || align=right | 2.8 km || 
|-id=210 bgcolor=#E9E9E9
| 109210 ||  || — || August 17, 2001 || Socorro || LINEAR || GEF || align=right | 2.5 km || 
|-id=211 bgcolor=#E9E9E9
| 109211 ||  || — || August 17, 2001 || Socorro || LINEAR || — || align=right | 2.6 km || 
|-id=212 bgcolor=#E9E9E9
| 109212 ||  || — || August 17, 2001 || Socorro || LINEAR || — || align=right | 2.6 km || 
|-id=213 bgcolor=#E9E9E9
| 109213 ||  || — || August 18, 2001 || Socorro || LINEAR || — || align=right | 3.9 km || 
|-id=214 bgcolor=#d6d6d6
| 109214 ||  || — || August 19, 2001 || Socorro || LINEAR || URS || align=right | 8.4 km || 
|-id=215 bgcolor=#E9E9E9
| 109215 ||  || — || August 19, 2001 || Socorro || LINEAR || MAR || align=right | 2.6 km || 
|-id=216 bgcolor=#E9E9E9
| 109216 ||  || — || August 22, 2001 || Desert Eagle || W. K. Y. Yeung || — || align=right | 2.6 km || 
|-id=217 bgcolor=#E9E9E9
| 109217 ||  || — || August 22, 2001 || Desert Eagle || W. K. Y. Yeung || — || align=right | 1.9 km || 
|-id=218 bgcolor=#E9E9E9
| 109218 ||  || — || August 16, 2001 || Palomar || NEAT || — || align=right | 3.6 km || 
|-id=219 bgcolor=#E9E9E9
| 109219 ||  || — || August 16, 2001 || Palomar || NEAT || — || align=right | 3.7 km || 
|-id=220 bgcolor=#d6d6d6
| 109220 ||  || — || August 17, 2001 || Palomar || NEAT || — || align=right | 8.6 km || 
|-id=221 bgcolor=#E9E9E9
| 109221 ||  || — || August 17, 2001 || Palomar || NEAT || — || align=right | 3.3 km || 
|-id=222 bgcolor=#E9E9E9
| 109222 ||  || — || August 17, 2001 || Palomar || NEAT || EUN || align=right | 2.6 km || 
|-id=223 bgcolor=#fefefe
| 109223 ||  || — || August 22, 2001 || Needville || Needville Obs. || — || align=right | 1.4 km || 
|-id=224 bgcolor=#d6d6d6
| 109224 ||  || — || August 22, 2001 || Desert Eagle || W. K. Y. Yeung || — || align=right | 5.1 km || 
|-id=225 bgcolor=#fefefe
| 109225 ||  || — || August 16, 2001 || Palomar || NEAT || — || align=right | 1.9 km || 
|-id=226 bgcolor=#FA8072
| 109226 ||  || — || August 22, 2001 || Socorro || LINEAR || — || align=right | 4.0 km || 
|-id=227 bgcolor=#d6d6d6
| 109227 ||  || — || August 19, 2001 || Socorro || LINEAR || — || align=right | 4.0 km || 
|-id=228 bgcolor=#d6d6d6
| 109228 ||  || — || August 22, 2001 || Socorro || LINEAR || — || align=right | 4.7 km || 
|-id=229 bgcolor=#d6d6d6
| 109229 ||  || — || August 22, 2001 || Socorro || LINEAR || — || align=right | 9.0 km || 
|-id=230 bgcolor=#E9E9E9
| 109230 ||  || — || August 22, 2001 || Socorro || LINEAR || — || align=right | 3.2 km || 
|-id=231 bgcolor=#E9E9E9
| 109231 ||  || — || August 22, 2001 || Socorro || LINEAR || — || align=right | 4.3 km || 
|-id=232 bgcolor=#E9E9E9
| 109232 ||  || — || August 22, 2001 || Socorro || LINEAR || — || align=right | 2.5 km || 
|-id=233 bgcolor=#d6d6d6
| 109233 ||  || — || August 22, 2001 || Socorro || LINEAR || — || align=right | 12 km || 
|-id=234 bgcolor=#E9E9E9
| 109234 ||  || — || August 22, 2001 || Socorro || LINEAR || EUN || align=right | 4.2 km || 
|-id=235 bgcolor=#E9E9E9
| 109235 ||  || — || August 23, 2001 || Desert Eagle || W. K. Y. Yeung || — || align=right | 2.1 km || 
|-id=236 bgcolor=#E9E9E9
| 109236 ||  || — || August 23, 2001 || Desert Eagle || W. K. Y. Yeung || EUN || align=right | 2.5 km || 
|-id=237 bgcolor=#E9E9E9
| 109237 ||  || — || August 16, 2001 || Socorro || LINEAR || — || align=right | 2.7 km || 
|-id=238 bgcolor=#E9E9E9
| 109238 ||  || — || August 17, 2001 || Socorro || LINEAR || — || align=right | 1.9 km || 
|-id=239 bgcolor=#d6d6d6
| 109239 ||  || — || August 17, 2001 || Socorro || LINEAR || — || align=right | 7.6 km || 
|-id=240 bgcolor=#d6d6d6
| 109240 ||  || — || August 19, 2001 || Socorro || LINEAR || — || align=right | 7.9 km || 
|-id=241 bgcolor=#fefefe
| 109241 ||  || — || August 19, 2001 || Socorro || LINEAR || — || align=right | 2.4 km || 
|-id=242 bgcolor=#E9E9E9
| 109242 ||  || — || August 20, 2001 || Socorro || LINEAR || — || align=right | 4.2 km || 
|-id=243 bgcolor=#d6d6d6
| 109243 ||  || — || August 21, 2001 || Socorro || LINEAR || — || align=right | 8.2 km || 
|-id=244 bgcolor=#E9E9E9
| 109244 ||  || — || August 22, 2001 || Socorro || LINEAR || slow || align=right | 2.2 km || 
|-id=245 bgcolor=#fefefe
| 109245 ||  || — || August 22, 2001 || Socorro || LINEAR || — || align=right | 4.5 km || 
|-id=246 bgcolor=#d6d6d6
| 109246 ||  || — || August 16, 2001 || Socorro || LINEAR || — || align=right | 5.0 km || 
|-id=247 bgcolor=#fefefe
| 109247 ||  || — || August 18, 2001 || Socorro || LINEAR || — || align=right | 1.8 km || 
|-id=248 bgcolor=#E9E9E9
| 109248 ||  || — || August 18, 2001 || Socorro || LINEAR || EUN || align=right | 2.2 km || 
|-id=249 bgcolor=#d6d6d6
| 109249 ||  || — || August 19, 2001 || Socorro || LINEAR || — || align=right | 6.9 km || 
|-id=250 bgcolor=#d6d6d6
| 109250 ||  || — || August 19, 2001 || Socorro || LINEAR || — || align=right | 6.9 km || 
|-id=251 bgcolor=#fefefe
| 109251 ||  || — || August 19, 2001 || Socorro || LINEAR || NYS || align=right data-sort-value="0.99" | 990 m || 
|-id=252 bgcolor=#fefefe
| 109252 ||  || — || August 19, 2001 || Socorro || LINEAR || NYS || align=right | 1.3 km || 
|-id=253 bgcolor=#fefefe
| 109253 ||  || — || August 19, 2001 || Socorro || LINEAR || — || align=right | 1.8 km || 
|-id=254 bgcolor=#E9E9E9
| 109254 ||  || — || August 20, 2001 || Socorro || LINEAR || — || align=right | 3.5 km || 
|-id=255 bgcolor=#E9E9E9
| 109255 ||  || — || August 22, 2001 || Socorro || LINEAR || — || align=right | 2.3 km || 
|-id=256 bgcolor=#d6d6d6
| 109256 ||  || — || August 23, 2001 || Socorro || LINEAR || THB || align=right | 6.4 km || 
|-id=257 bgcolor=#E9E9E9
| 109257 ||  || — || August 23, 2001 || Socorro || LINEAR || — || align=right | 2.6 km || 
|-id=258 bgcolor=#fefefe
| 109258 ||  || — || August 18, 2001 || Anderson Mesa || LONEOS || — || align=right | 2.3 km || 
|-id=259 bgcolor=#E9E9E9
| 109259 ||  || — || August 18, 2001 || Anderson Mesa || LONEOS || EUN || align=right | 4.2 km || 
|-id=260 bgcolor=#E9E9E9
| 109260 ||  || — || August 21, 2001 || Socorro || LINEAR || RAF || align=right | 1.3 km || 
|-id=261 bgcolor=#d6d6d6
| 109261 ||  || — || August 25, 2001 || Anderson Mesa || LONEOS || HYG || align=right | 6.2 km || 
|-id=262 bgcolor=#d6d6d6
| 109262 ||  || — || August 25, 2001 || Anderson Mesa || LONEOS || — || align=right | 7.5 km || 
|-id=263 bgcolor=#d6d6d6
| 109263 ||  || — || August 24, 2001 || OCA-Anza || M. White, M. Collins || — || align=right | 3.9 km || 
|-id=264 bgcolor=#d6d6d6
| 109264 ||  || — || August 20, 2001 || Haleakala || NEAT || — || align=right | 4.0 km || 
|-id=265 bgcolor=#d6d6d6
| 109265 ||  || — || August 21, 2001 || Haleakala || NEAT || EUP || align=right | 7.9 km || 
|-id=266 bgcolor=#C2FFFF
| 109266 ||  || — || August 19, 2001 || Ondřejov || P. Kušnirák || L5 || align=right | 11 km || 
|-id=267 bgcolor=#E9E9E9
| 109267 ||  || — || August 26, 2001 || Farpoint || Farpoint Obs. || — || align=right | 5.1 km || 
|-id=268 bgcolor=#d6d6d6
| 109268 ||  || — || August 22, 2001 || Socorro || LINEAR || — || align=right | 8.2 km || 
|-id=269 bgcolor=#fefefe
| 109269 ||  || — || August 22, 2001 || Socorro || LINEAR || V || align=right | 1.7 km || 
|-id=270 bgcolor=#d6d6d6
| 109270 ||  || — || August 24, 2001 || Socorro || LINEAR || TEL || align=right | 3.9 km || 
|-id=271 bgcolor=#E9E9E9
| 109271 ||  || — || August 25, 2001 || Socorro || LINEAR || — || align=right | 2.4 km || 
|-id=272 bgcolor=#d6d6d6
| 109272 ||  || — || August 25, 2001 || Socorro || LINEAR || EOS || align=right | 4.6 km || 
|-id=273 bgcolor=#d6d6d6
| 109273 ||  || — || August 17, 2001 || Socorro || LINEAR || — || align=right | 4.3 km || 
|-id=274 bgcolor=#fefefe
| 109274 ||  || — || August 17, 2001 || Socorro || LINEAR || — || align=right | 1.8 km || 
|-id=275 bgcolor=#E9E9E9
| 109275 ||  || — || August 17, 2001 || Socorro || LINEAR || EUN || align=right | 3.4 km || 
|-id=276 bgcolor=#E9E9E9
| 109276 ||  || — || August 17, 2001 || Socorro || LINEAR || RAF || align=right | 1.5 km || 
|-id=277 bgcolor=#E9E9E9
| 109277 ||  || — || August 17, 2001 || Socorro || LINEAR || KAZ || align=right | 4.5 km || 
|-id=278 bgcolor=#E9E9E9
| 109278 ||  || — || August 17, 2001 || Socorro || LINEAR || — || align=right | 2.2 km || 
|-id=279 bgcolor=#E9E9E9
| 109279 ||  || — || August 17, 2001 || Socorro || LINEAR || — || align=right | 2.2 km || 
|-id=280 bgcolor=#E9E9E9
| 109280 ||  || — || August 17, 2001 || Socorro || LINEAR || — || align=right | 3.2 km || 
|-id=281 bgcolor=#E9E9E9
| 109281 ||  || — || August 17, 2001 || Socorro || LINEAR || — || align=right | 4.8 km || 
|-id=282 bgcolor=#fefefe
| 109282 ||  || — || August 18, 2001 || Socorro || LINEAR || NYS || align=right | 1.8 km || 
|-id=283 bgcolor=#E9E9E9
| 109283 ||  || — || August 18, 2001 || Socorro || LINEAR || — || align=right | 1.4 km || 
|-id=284 bgcolor=#E9E9E9
| 109284 ||  || — || August 19, 2001 || Socorro || LINEAR || — || align=right | 5.1 km || 
|-id=285 bgcolor=#E9E9E9
| 109285 ||  || — || August 19, 2001 || Socorro || LINEAR || ADE || align=right | 5.1 km || 
|-id=286 bgcolor=#d6d6d6
| 109286 ||  || — || August 19, 2001 || Socorro || LINEAR || — || align=right | 7.5 km || 
|-id=287 bgcolor=#d6d6d6
| 109287 ||  || — || August 19, 2001 || Socorro || LINEAR || — || align=right | 6.2 km || 
|-id=288 bgcolor=#E9E9E9
| 109288 ||  || — || August 19, 2001 || Socorro || LINEAR || — || align=right | 4.5 km || 
|-id=289 bgcolor=#d6d6d6
| 109289 ||  || — || August 19, 2001 || Socorro || LINEAR || TEL || align=right | 2.9 km || 
|-id=290 bgcolor=#fefefe
| 109290 ||  || — || August 19, 2001 || Socorro || LINEAR || NYS || align=right | 1.4 km || 
|-id=291 bgcolor=#d6d6d6
| 109291 ||  || — || August 19, 2001 || Socorro || LINEAR || — || align=right | 3.6 km || 
|-id=292 bgcolor=#fefefe
| 109292 ||  || — || August 19, 2001 || Socorro || LINEAR || NYS || align=right | 1.4 km || 
|-id=293 bgcolor=#E9E9E9
| 109293 ||  || — || August 19, 2001 || Socorro || LINEAR || — || align=right | 1.6 km || 
|-id=294 bgcolor=#E9E9E9
| 109294 ||  || — || August 19, 2001 || Socorro || LINEAR || — || align=right | 1.9 km || 
|-id=295 bgcolor=#d6d6d6
| 109295 ||  || — || August 19, 2001 || Socorro || LINEAR || — || align=right | 5.6 km || 
|-id=296 bgcolor=#d6d6d6
| 109296 ||  || — || August 19, 2001 || Socorro || LINEAR || — || align=right | 6.4 km || 
|-id=297 bgcolor=#fefefe
| 109297 ||  || — || August 20, 2001 || Socorro || LINEAR || — || align=right | 3.2 km || 
|-id=298 bgcolor=#E9E9E9
| 109298 ||  || — || August 20, 2001 || Socorro || LINEAR || — || align=right | 2.5 km || 
|-id=299 bgcolor=#fefefe
| 109299 ||  || — || August 20, 2001 || Socorro || LINEAR || V || align=right | 1.5 km || 
|-id=300 bgcolor=#E9E9E9
| 109300 ||  || — || August 20, 2001 || Socorro || LINEAR || — || align=right | 6.3 km || 
|}

109301–109400 

|-bgcolor=#d6d6d6
| 109301 ||  || — || August 20, 2001 || Socorro || LINEAR || EOS || align=right | 4.0 km || 
|-id=302 bgcolor=#E9E9E9
| 109302 ||  || — || August 20, 2001 || Socorro || LINEAR || — || align=right | 3.4 km || 
|-id=303 bgcolor=#fefefe
| 109303 ||  || — || August 20, 2001 || Socorro || LINEAR || V || align=right | 1.5 km || 
|-id=304 bgcolor=#fefefe
| 109304 ||  || — || August 20, 2001 || Socorro || LINEAR || — || align=right | 2.3 km || 
|-id=305 bgcolor=#d6d6d6
| 109305 ||  || — || August 20, 2001 || Socorro || LINEAR || EOS || align=right | 4.0 km || 
|-id=306 bgcolor=#E9E9E9
| 109306 ||  || — || August 20, 2001 || Socorro || LINEAR || — || align=right | 2.6 km || 
|-id=307 bgcolor=#fefefe
| 109307 ||  || — || August 20, 2001 || Socorro || LINEAR || — || align=right | 1.8 km || 
|-id=308 bgcolor=#E9E9E9
| 109308 ||  || — || August 20, 2001 || Socorro || LINEAR || RAF || align=right | 2.2 km || 
|-id=309 bgcolor=#d6d6d6
| 109309 ||  || — || August 21, 2001 || Socorro || LINEAR || — || align=right | 5.4 km || 
|-id=310 bgcolor=#E9E9E9
| 109310 ||  || — || August 21, 2001 || Socorro || LINEAR || — || align=right | 2.2 km || 
|-id=311 bgcolor=#d6d6d6
| 109311 ||  || — || August 21, 2001 || Socorro || LINEAR || — || align=right | 7.3 km || 
|-id=312 bgcolor=#E9E9E9
| 109312 ||  || — || August 22, 2001 || Socorro || LINEAR || — || align=right | 4.7 km || 
|-id=313 bgcolor=#d6d6d6
| 109313 ||  || — || August 22, 2001 || Socorro || LINEAR || EOS || align=right | 6.1 km || 
|-id=314 bgcolor=#d6d6d6
| 109314 ||  || — || August 22, 2001 || Socorro || LINEAR || — || align=right | 11 km || 
|-id=315 bgcolor=#E9E9E9
| 109315 ||  || — || August 22, 2001 || Socorro || LINEAR || BRU || align=right | 4.3 km || 
|-id=316 bgcolor=#E9E9E9
| 109316 ||  || — || August 22, 2001 || Socorro || LINEAR || — || align=right | 2.3 km || 
|-id=317 bgcolor=#E9E9E9
| 109317 ||  || — || August 22, 2001 || Socorro || LINEAR || — || align=right | 3.6 km || 
|-id=318 bgcolor=#E9E9E9
| 109318 ||  || — || August 22, 2001 || Socorro || LINEAR || — || align=right | 3.1 km || 
|-id=319 bgcolor=#E9E9E9
| 109319 ||  || — || August 22, 2001 || Socorro || LINEAR || — || align=right | 2.9 km || 
|-id=320 bgcolor=#E9E9E9
| 109320 ||  || — || August 22, 2001 || Socorro || LINEAR || GEF || align=right | 2.4 km || 
|-id=321 bgcolor=#E9E9E9
| 109321 ||  || — || August 22, 2001 || Socorro || LINEAR || — || align=right | 3.7 km || 
|-id=322 bgcolor=#E9E9E9
| 109322 ||  || — || August 22, 2001 || Socorro || LINEAR || — || align=right | 2.8 km || 
|-id=323 bgcolor=#E9E9E9
| 109323 ||  || — || August 22, 2001 || Socorro || LINEAR || — || align=right | 5.1 km || 
|-id=324 bgcolor=#E9E9E9
| 109324 ||  || — || August 22, 2001 || Socorro || LINEAR || EUN || align=right | 4.4 km || 
|-id=325 bgcolor=#E9E9E9
| 109325 ||  || — || August 22, 2001 || Socorro || LINEAR || GEF || align=right | 2.4 km || 
|-id=326 bgcolor=#E9E9E9
| 109326 ||  || — || August 22, 2001 || Socorro || LINEAR || — || align=right | 8.4 km || 
|-id=327 bgcolor=#d6d6d6
| 109327 ||  || — || August 22, 2001 || Socorro || LINEAR || — || align=right | 6.9 km || 
|-id=328 bgcolor=#E9E9E9
| 109328 ||  || — || August 23, 2001 || Socorro || LINEAR || — || align=right | 2.6 km || 
|-id=329 bgcolor=#fefefe
| 109329 ||  || — || August 24, 2001 || Socorro || LINEAR || — || align=right | 1.9 km || 
|-id=330 bgcolor=#d6d6d6
| 109330 Clemente ||  ||  || August 24, 2001 || Goodricke-Pigott || R. A. Tucker || — || align=right | 3.8 km || 
|-id=331 bgcolor=#fefefe
| 109331 ||  || — || August 24, 2001 || Goodricke-Pigott || R. A. Tucker || — || align=right | 2.4 km || 
|-id=332 bgcolor=#E9E9E9
| 109332 ||  || — || August 21, 2001 || Kitt Peak || Spacewatch || — || align=right | 2.2 km || 
|-id=333 bgcolor=#fefefe
| 109333 ||  || — || August 21, 2001 || Kitt Peak || Spacewatch || — || align=right | 1.2 km || 
|-id=334 bgcolor=#E9E9E9
| 109334 ||  || — || August 21, 2001 || Kitt Peak || Spacewatch || — || align=right | 1.9 km || 
|-id=335 bgcolor=#d6d6d6
| 109335 ||  || — || August 21, 2001 || Kitt Peak || Spacewatch || — || align=right | 3.7 km || 
|-id=336 bgcolor=#d6d6d6
| 109336 ||  || — || August 21, 2001 || Kitt Peak || Spacewatch || — || align=right | 2.8 km || 
|-id=337 bgcolor=#E9E9E9
| 109337 ||  || — || August 20, 2001 || Palomar || NEAT || — || align=right | 3.1 km || 
|-id=338 bgcolor=#E9E9E9
| 109338 ||  || — || August 20, 2001 || Palomar || NEAT || — || align=right | 3.8 km || 
|-id=339 bgcolor=#E9E9E9
| 109339 ||  || — || August 20, 2001 || Palomar || NEAT || HNS || align=right | 1.8 km || 
|-id=340 bgcolor=#E9E9E9
| 109340 ||  || — || August 20, 2001 || Palomar || NEAT || — || align=right | 4.4 km || 
|-id=341 bgcolor=#E9E9E9
| 109341 ||  || — || August 20, 2001 || Haleakala || NEAT || EUN || align=right | 2.5 km || 
|-id=342 bgcolor=#d6d6d6
| 109342 ||  || — || August 20, 2001 || Haleakala || NEAT || — || align=right | 6.4 km || 
|-id=343 bgcolor=#E9E9E9
| 109343 ||  || — || August 21, 2001 || Haleakala || NEAT || AGN || align=right | 2.2 km || 
|-id=344 bgcolor=#fefefe
| 109344 ||  || — || August 22, 2001 || Haleakala || NEAT || NYS || align=right | 3.4 km || 
|-id=345 bgcolor=#E9E9E9
| 109345 ||  || — || August 25, 2001 || Palomar || NEAT || — || align=right | 2.1 km || 
|-id=346 bgcolor=#FA8072
| 109346 ||  || — || August 27, 2001 || Palomar || NEAT || — || align=right | 1.9 km || 
|-id=347 bgcolor=#FA8072
| 109347 ||  || — || August 23, 2001 || Socorro || LINEAR || H || align=right | 2.1 km || 
|-id=348 bgcolor=#E9E9E9
| 109348 ||  || — || August 22, 2001 || Desert Eagle || W. K. Y. Yeung || — || align=right | 2.5 km || 
|-id=349 bgcolor=#E9E9E9
| 109349 ||  || — || August 23, 2001 || Desert Eagle || W. K. Y. Yeung || — || align=right | 2.2 km || 
|-id=350 bgcolor=#E9E9E9
| 109350 ||  || — || August 25, 2001 || Desert Eagle || W. K. Y. Yeung || — || align=right | 4.5 km || 
|-id=351 bgcolor=#E9E9E9
| 109351 ||  || — || August 27, 2001 || Farpoint || G. Hug || — || align=right | 2.6 km || 
|-id=352 bgcolor=#fefefe
| 109352 ||  || — || August 18, 2001 || Kvistaberg || UDAS || V || align=right | 1.8 km || 
|-id=353 bgcolor=#d6d6d6
| 109353 ||  || — || August 26, 2001 || Ondřejov || Ondřejov Obs. || — || align=right | 3.5 km || 
|-id=354 bgcolor=#E9E9E9
| 109354 ||  || — || August 26, 2001 || Ondřejov || P. Pravec, P. Kušnirák || — || align=right | 2.9 km || 
|-id=355 bgcolor=#E9E9E9
| 109355 ||  || — || August 28, 2001 || Farpoint || G. Hug || — || align=right | 2.7 km || 
|-id=356 bgcolor=#fefefe
| 109356 ||  || — || August 23, 2001 || Anderson Mesa || LONEOS || V || align=right | 1.5 km || 
|-id=357 bgcolor=#E9E9E9
| 109357 ||  || — || August 23, 2001 || Anderson Mesa || LONEOS || EUN || align=right | 3.6 km || 
|-id=358 bgcolor=#E9E9E9
| 109358 ||  || — || August 23, 2001 || Anderson Mesa || LONEOS || — || align=right | 4.6 km || 
|-id=359 bgcolor=#E9E9E9
| 109359 ||  || — || August 23, 2001 || Anderson Mesa || LONEOS || — || align=right | 2.5 km || 
|-id=360 bgcolor=#d6d6d6
| 109360 ||  || — || August 23, 2001 || Anderson Mesa || LONEOS || EOS || align=right | 3.5 km || 
|-id=361 bgcolor=#E9E9E9
| 109361 ||  || — || August 23, 2001 || Anderson Mesa || LONEOS || — || align=right | 3.0 km || 
|-id=362 bgcolor=#fefefe
| 109362 ||  || — || August 23, 2001 || Anderson Mesa || LONEOS || Vslow? || align=right | 1.5 km || 
|-id=363 bgcolor=#fefefe
| 109363 ||  || — || August 23, 2001 || Anderson Mesa || LONEOS || ERI || align=right | 4.2 km || 
|-id=364 bgcolor=#E9E9E9
| 109364 ||  || — || August 23, 2001 || Anderson Mesa || LONEOS || — || align=right | 2.0 km || 
|-id=365 bgcolor=#E9E9E9
| 109365 ||  || — || August 23, 2001 || Anderson Mesa || LONEOS || — || align=right | 2.8 km || 
|-id=366 bgcolor=#E9E9E9
| 109366 ||  || — || August 23, 2001 || Anderson Mesa || LONEOS || — || align=right | 1.8 km || 
|-id=367 bgcolor=#E9E9E9
| 109367 ||  || — || August 23, 2001 || Anderson Mesa || LONEOS || — || align=right | 1.8 km || 
|-id=368 bgcolor=#fefefe
| 109368 ||  || — || August 23, 2001 || Anderson Mesa || LONEOS || CLA || align=right | 3.2 km || 
|-id=369 bgcolor=#d6d6d6
| 109369 ||  || — || August 23, 2001 || Anderson Mesa || LONEOS || — || align=right | 6.8 km || 
|-id=370 bgcolor=#E9E9E9
| 109370 ||  || — || August 23, 2001 || Anderson Mesa || LONEOS || — || align=right | 3.1 km || 
|-id=371 bgcolor=#E9E9E9
| 109371 ||  || — || August 23, 2001 || Anderson Mesa || LONEOS || — || align=right | 1.6 km || 
|-id=372 bgcolor=#E9E9E9
| 109372 ||  || — || August 23, 2001 || Anderson Mesa || LONEOS || — || align=right | 2.0 km || 
|-id=373 bgcolor=#d6d6d6
| 109373 ||  || — || August 23, 2001 || Anderson Mesa || LONEOS || — || align=right | 6.3 km || 
|-id=374 bgcolor=#d6d6d6
| 109374 ||  || — || August 23, 2001 || Anderson Mesa || LONEOS || THM || align=right | 5.1 km || 
|-id=375 bgcolor=#d6d6d6
| 109375 ||  || — || August 23, 2001 || Anderson Mesa || LONEOS || EOS || align=right | 5.0 km || 
|-id=376 bgcolor=#E9E9E9
| 109376 ||  || — || August 23, 2001 || Anderson Mesa || LONEOS || MAR || align=right | 2.6 km || 
|-id=377 bgcolor=#d6d6d6
| 109377 ||  || — || August 23, 2001 || Anderson Mesa || LONEOS || — || align=right | 4.7 km || 
|-id=378 bgcolor=#E9E9E9
| 109378 ||  || — || August 31, 2001 || Desert Eagle || W. K. Y. Yeung || — || align=right | 3.7 km || 
|-id=379 bgcolor=#E9E9E9
| 109379 ||  || — || August 31, 2001 || Desert Eagle || W. K. Y. Yeung || — || align=right | 2.2 km || 
|-id=380 bgcolor=#E9E9E9
| 109380 ||  || — || August 22, 2001 || Palomar || NEAT || — || align=right | 7.1 km || 
|-id=381 bgcolor=#fefefe
| 109381 ||  || — || August 22, 2001 || Haleakala || NEAT || — || align=right | 2.4 km || 
|-id=382 bgcolor=#d6d6d6
| 109382 ||  || — || August 24, 2001 || Haleakala || NEAT || — || align=right | 7.3 km || 
|-id=383 bgcolor=#E9E9E9
| 109383 ||  || — || August 24, 2001 || Haleakala || NEAT || — || align=right | 5.1 km || 
|-id=384 bgcolor=#d6d6d6
| 109384 ||  || — || August 24, 2001 || Haleakala || NEAT || — || align=right | 6.7 km || 
|-id=385 bgcolor=#d6d6d6
| 109385 ||  || — || August 25, 2001 || Haleakala || NEAT || — || align=right | 3.3 km || 
|-id=386 bgcolor=#E9E9E9
| 109386 ||  || — || August 25, 2001 || Haleakala || NEAT || — || align=right | 2.3 km || 
|-id=387 bgcolor=#E9E9E9
| 109387 ||  || — || August 25, 2001 || Palomar || NEAT || — || align=right | 2.2 km || 
|-id=388 bgcolor=#fefefe
| 109388 ||  || — || August 26, 2001 || Palomar || NEAT || — || align=right | 2.2 km || 
|-id=389 bgcolor=#fefefe
| 109389 ||  || — || August 26, 2001 || Haleakala || NEAT || FLO || align=right | 1.5 km || 
|-id=390 bgcolor=#E9E9E9
| 109390 ||  || — || August 22, 2001 || Socorro || LINEAR || — || align=right | 2.2 km || 
|-id=391 bgcolor=#E9E9E9
| 109391 ||  || — || August 25, 2001 || Socorro || LINEAR || — || align=right | 4.3 km || 
|-id=392 bgcolor=#d6d6d6
| 109392 ||  || — || August 25, 2001 || Socorro || LINEAR || — || align=right | 7.7 km || 
|-id=393 bgcolor=#d6d6d6
| 109393 ||  || — || August 25, 2001 || Socorro || LINEAR || EOS || align=right | 3.9 km || 
|-id=394 bgcolor=#E9E9E9
| 109394 ||  || — || August 25, 2001 || Socorro || LINEAR || — || align=right | 2.1 km || 
|-id=395 bgcolor=#d6d6d6
| 109395 ||  || — || August 21, 2001 || Kitt Peak || Spacewatch || — || align=right | 6.4 km || 
|-id=396 bgcolor=#E9E9E9
| 109396 ||  || — || August 25, 2001 || Palomar || NEAT || — || align=right | 4.8 km || 
|-id=397 bgcolor=#d6d6d6
| 109397 ||  || — || August 26, 2001 || Haleakala || NEAT || TIR || align=right | 6.0 km || 
|-id=398 bgcolor=#E9E9E9
| 109398 ||  || — || August 27, 2001 || Palomar || NEAT || — || align=right | 5.4 km || 
|-id=399 bgcolor=#d6d6d6
| 109399 ||  || — || August 25, 2001 || Palomar || NEAT || — || align=right | 7.4 km || 
|-id=400 bgcolor=#d6d6d6
| 109400 ||  || — || August 25, 2001 || Palomar || NEAT || EOS || align=right | 5.1 km || 
|}

109401–109500 

|-bgcolor=#d6d6d6
| 109401 ||  || — || August 25, 2001 || Palomar || NEAT || — || align=right | 5.0 km || 
|-id=402 bgcolor=#E9E9E9
| 109402 ||  || — || August 25, 2001 || Palomar || NEAT || — || align=right | 1.9 km || 
|-id=403 bgcolor=#d6d6d6
| 109403 ||  || — || August 26, 2001 || Palomar || NEAT || EUP || align=right | 8.2 km || 
|-id=404 bgcolor=#E9E9E9
| 109404 ||  || — || August 27, 2001 || Palomar || NEAT || — || align=right | 2.2 km || 
|-id=405 bgcolor=#E9E9E9
| 109405 ||  || — || August 27, 2001 || Palomar || NEAT || EUN || align=right | 3.0 km || 
|-id=406 bgcolor=#E9E9E9
| 109406 ||  || — || August 30, 2001 || Palomar || NEAT || — || align=right | 4.5 km || 
|-id=407 bgcolor=#d6d6d6
| 109407 ||  || — || August 29, 2001 || Palomar || NEAT || — || align=right | 4.2 km || 
|-id=408 bgcolor=#E9E9E9
| 109408 ||  || — || August 21, 2001 || Socorro || LINEAR || — || align=right | 3.3 km || 
|-id=409 bgcolor=#d6d6d6
| 109409 ||  || — || August 21, 2001 || Socorro || LINEAR || — || align=right | 4.2 km || 
|-id=410 bgcolor=#E9E9E9
| 109410 ||  || — || August 21, 2001 || Socorro || LINEAR || — || align=right | 2.6 km || 
|-id=411 bgcolor=#E9E9E9
| 109411 ||  || — || August 21, 2001 || Socorro || LINEAR || — || align=right | 6.2 km || 
|-id=412 bgcolor=#E9E9E9
| 109412 ||  || — || August 21, 2001 || Haleakala || NEAT || — || align=right | 3.0 km || 
|-id=413 bgcolor=#E9E9E9
| 109413 ||  || — || August 21, 2001 || Palomar || NEAT || HNS || align=right | 3.0 km || 
|-id=414 bgcolor=#E9E9E9
| 109414 ||  || — || August 21, 2001 || Palomar || NEAT || — || align=right | 2.5 km || 
|-id=415 bgcolor=#E9E9E9
| 109415 ||  || — || August 21, 2001 || Haleakala || NEAT || — || align=right | 3.7 km || 
|-id=416 bgcolor=#E9E9E9
| 109416 ||  || — || August 22, 2001 || Kitt Peak || Spacewatch || — || align=right | 2.2 km || 
|-id=417 bgcolor=#d6d6d6
| 109417 ||  || — || August 22, 2001 || Socorro || LINEAR || — || align=right | 6.6 km || 
|-id=418 bgcolor=#E9E9E9
| 109418 ||  || — || August 22, 2001 || Socorro || LINEAR || JNS || align=right | 5.7 km || 
|-id=419 bgcolor=#E9E9E9
| 109419 ||  || — || August 22, 2001 || Socorro || LINEAR || EUN || align=right | 2.7 km || 
|-id=420 bgcolor=#E9E9E9
| 109420 ||  || — || August 22, 2001 || Socorro || LINEAR || — || align=right | 2.5 km || 
|-id=421 bgcolor=#E9E9E9
| 109421 ||  || — || August 22, 2001 || Socorro || LINEAR || MAR || align=right | 2.3 km || 
|-id=422 bgcolor=#d6d6d6
| 109422 ||  || — || August 22, 2001 || Socorro || LINEAR || — || align=right | 7.9 km || 
|-id=423 bgcolor=#E9E9E9
| 109423 ||  || — || August 22, 2001 || Socorro || LINEAR || — || align=right | 3.5 km || 
|-id=424 bgcolor=#d6d6d6
| 109424 ||  || — || August 22, 2001 || Socorro || LINEAR || — || align=right | 5.9 km || 
|-id=425 bgcolor=#E9E9E9
| 109425 ||  || — || August 22, 2001 || Socorro || LINEAR || EUN || align=right | 3.9 km || 
|-id=426 bgcolor=#E9E9E9
| 109426 ||  || — || August 22, 2001 || Socorro || LINEAR || — || align=right | 2.3 km || 
|-id=427 bgcolor=#d6d6d6
| 109427 ||  || — || August 22, 2001 || Palomar || NEAT || — || align=right | 7.9 km || 
|-id=428 bgcolor=#d6d6d6
| 109428 ||  || — || August 22, 2001 || Socorro || LINEAR || EUP || align=right | 10 km || 
|-id=429 bgcolor=#E9E9E9
| 109429 ||  || — || August 22, 2001 || Socorro || LINEAR || — || align=right | 2.7 km || 
|-id=430 bgcolor=#E9E9E9
| 109430 ||  || — || August 22, 2001 || Socorro || LINEAR || — || align=right | 3.6 km || 
|-id=431 bgcolor=#E9E9E9
| 109431 ||  || — || August 22, 2001 || Palomar || NEAT || — || align=right | 2.9 km || 
|-id=432 bgcolor=#E9E9E9
| 109432 ||  || — || August 22, 2001 || Socorro || LINEAR || EUN || align=right | 2.7 km || 
|-id=433 bgcolor=#d6d6d6
| 109433 ||  || — || August 22, 2001 || Haleakala || NEAT || URS || align=right | 7.1 km || 
|-id=434 bgcolor=#E9E9E9
| 109434 ||  || — || August 22, 2001 || Kitt Peak || Spacewatch || — || align=right | 3.3 km || 
|-id=435 bgcolor=#d6d6d6
| 109435 Giraud ||  ||  || August 22, 2001 || Goodricke-Pigott || R. A. Tucker || ALA || align=right | 10 km || 
|-id=436 bgcolor=#E9E9E9
| 109436 ||  || — || August 22, 2001 || Socorro || LINEAR || — || align=right | 3.5 km || 
|-id=437 bgcolor=#E9E9E9
| 109437 ||  || — || August 22, 2001 || Socorro || LINEAR || — || align=right | 3.6 km || 
|-id=438 bgcolor=#d6d6d6
| 109438 ||  || — || August 22, 2001 || Socorro || LINEAR || — || align=right | 7.9 km || 
|-id=439 bgcolor=#E9E9E9
| 109439 ||  || — || August 22, 2001 || Socorro || LINEAR || NEM || align=right | 5.4 km || 
|-id=440 bgcolor=#E9E9E9
| 109440 ||  || — || August 22, 2001 || Socorro || LINEAR || — || align=right | 2.8 km || 
|-id=441 bgcolor=#E9E9E9
| 109441 ||  || — || August 22, 2001 || Palomar || NEAT || — || align=right | 4.5 km || 
|-id=442 bgcolor=#E9E9E9
| 109442 ||  || — || August 22, 2001 || Socorro || LINEAR || — || align=right | 3.2 km || 
|-id=443 bgcolor=#E9E9E9
| 109443 ||  || — || August 22, 2001 || Socorro || LINEAR || EUN || align=right | 2.2 km || 
|-id=444 bgcolor=#d6d6d6
| 109444 ||  || — || August 22, 2001 || Kitt Peak || Spacewatch || HYG || align=right | 5.4 km || 
|-id=445 bgcolor=#E9E9E9
| 109445 ||  || — || August 22, 2001 || Palomar || NEAT || — || align=right | 2.7 km || 
|-id=446 bgcolor=#d6d6d6
| 109446 ||  || — || August 23, 2001 || Anderson Mesa || LONEOS || — || align=right | 5.9 km || 
|-id=447 bgcolor=#fefefe
| 109447 ||  || — || August 23, 2001 || Socorro || LINEAR || V || align=right | 1.6 km || 
|-id=448 bgcolor=#E9E9E9
| 109448 ||  || — || August 23, 2001 || Anderson Mesa || LONEOS || RAF || align=right | 2.1 km || 
|-id=449 bgcolor=#fefefe
| 109449 ||  || — || August 23, 2001 || Anderson Mesa || LONEOS || — || align=right | 1.4 km || 
|-id=450 bgcolor=#d6d6d6
| 109450 ||  || — || August 23, 2001 || Anderson Mesa || LONEOS || — || align=right | 4.3 km || 
|-id=451 bgcolor=#d6d6d6
| 109451 ||  || — || August 23, 2001 || Anderson Mesa || LONEOS || THM || align=right | 5.6 km || 
|-id=452 bgcolor=#d6d6d6
| 109452 ||  || — || August 23, 2001 || Anderson Mesa || LONEOS || — || align=right | 6.4 km || 
|-id=453 bgcolor=#d6d6d6
| 109453 ||  || — || August 23, 2001 || Anderson Mesa || LONEOS || — || align=right | 5.6 km || 
|-id=454 bgcolor=#E9E9E9
| 109454 ||  || — || August 23, 2001 || Anderson Mesa || LONEOS || HNS || align=right | 2.3 km || 
|-id=455 bgcolor=#E9E9E9
| 109455 ||  || — || August 23, 2001 || Kitt Peak || Spacewatch || — || align=right | 1.9 km || 
|-id=456 bgcolor=#E9E9E9
| 109456 ||  || — || August 23, 2001 || Anderson Mesa || LONEOS || — || align=right | 4.8 km || 
|-id=457 bgcolor=#fefefe
| 109457 ||  || — || August 23, 2001 || Anderson Mesa || LONEOS || — || align=right | 2.4 km || 
|-id=458 bgcolor=#fefefe
| 109458 ||  || — || August 23, 2001 || Anderson Mesa || LONEOS || KLI || align=right | 2.7 km || 
|-id=459 bgcolor=#d6d6d6
| 109459 ||  || — || August 23, 2001 || Anderson Mesa || LONEOS || THM || align=right | 5.7 km || 
|-id=460 bgcolor=#E9E9E9
| 109460 ||  || — || August 23, 2001 || Anderson Mesa || LONEOS || HEN || align=right | 2.0 km || 
|-id=461 bgcolor=#d6d6d6
| 109461 ||  || — || August 23, 2001 || Anderson Mesa || LONEOS || EOS || align=right | 4.2 km || 
|-id=462 bgcolor=#E9E9E9
| 109462 ||  || — || August 23, 2001 || Anderson Mesa || LONEOS || — || align=right | 2.2 km || 
|-id=463 bgcolor=#E9E9E9
| 109463 ||  || — || August 23, 2001 || Anderson Mesa || LONEOS || — || align=right | 1.7 km || 
|-id=464 bgcolor=#fefefe
| 109464 ||  || — || August 23, 2001 || Anderson Mesa || LONEOS || — || align=right | 2.1 km || 
|-id=465 bgcolor=#fefefe
| 109465 ||  || — || August 23, 2001 || Anderson Mesa || LONEOS || — || align=right | 1.7 km || 
|-id=466 bgcolor=#d6d6d6
| 109466 ||  || — || August 23, 2001 || Anderson Mesa || LONEOS || — || align=right | 5.2 km || 
|-id=467 bgcolor=#E9E9E9
| 109467 ||  || — || August 23, 2001 || Anderson Mesa || LONEOS || — || align=right | 2.4 km || 
|-id=468 bgcolor=#E9E9E9
| 109468 ||  || — || August 23, 2001 || Anderson Mesa || LONEOS || — || align=right | 2.4 km || 
|-id=469 bgcolor=#E9E9E9
| 109469 ||  || — || August 23, 2001 || Anderson Mesa || LONEOS || MAR || align=right | 1.9 km || 
|-id=470 bgcolor=#fefefe
| 109470 ||  || — || August 23, 2001 || Anderson Mesa || LONEOS || V || align=right | 1.7 km || 
|-id=471 bgcolor=#fefefe
| 109471 ||  || — || August 23, 2001 || Anderson Mesa || LONEOS || NYS || align=right | 1.3 km || 
|-id=472 bgcolor=#fefefe
| 109472 ||  || — || August 23, 2001 || Anderson Mesa || LONEOS || — || align=right | 1.8 km || 
|-id=473 bgcolor=#E9E9E9
| 109473 ||  || — || August 23, 2001 || Anderson Mesa || LONEOS || EUN || align=right | 2.3 km || 
|-id=474 bgcolor=#E9E9E9
| 109474 ||  || — || August 23, 2001 || Desert Eagle || W. K. Y. Yeung || — || align=right | 2.5 km || 
|-id=475 bgcolor=#E9E9E9
| 109475 ||  || — || August 23, 2001 || Socorro || LINEAR || — || align=right | 4.8 km || 
|-id=476 bgcolor=#E9E9E9
| 109476 ||  || — || August 24, 2001 || Anderson Mesa || LONEOS || RAF || align=right | 2.1 km || 
|-id=477 bgcolor=#d6d6d6
| 109477 ||  || — || August 24, 2001 || Anderson Mesa || LONEOS || EOS || align=right | 3.6 km || 
|-id=478 bgcolor=#d6d6d6
| 109478 ||  || — || August 24, 2001 || Anderson Mesa || LONEOS || CHA || align=right | 3.8 km || 
|-id=479 bgcolor=#E9E9E9
| 109479 ||  || — || August 24, 2001 || Anderson Mesa || LONEOS || EUN || align=right | 2.4 km || 
|-id=480 bgcolor=#d6d6d6
| 109480 ||  || — || August 24, 2001 || Anderson Mesa || LONEOS || — || align=right | 4.9 km || 
|-id=481 bgcolor=#d6d6d6
| 109481 ||  || — || August 24, 2001 || Anderson Mesa || LONEOS || — || align=right | 6.1 km || 
|-id=482 bgcolor=#E9E9E9
| 109482 ||  || — || August 24, 2001 || Anderson Mesa || LONEOS || — || align=right | 5.0 km || 
|-id=483 bgcolor=#d6d6d6
| 109483 ||  || — || August 24, 2001 || Anderson Mesa || LONEOS || — || align=right | 5.2 km || 
|-id=484 bgcolor=#fefefe
| 109484 ||  || — || August 24, 2001 || Anderson Mesa || LONEOS || NYS || align=right | 1.4 km || 
|-id=485 bgcolor=#d6d6d6
| 109485 ||  || — || August 24, 2001 || Anderson Mesa || LONEOS || — || align=right | 7.5 km || 
|-id=486 bgcolor=#fefefe
| 109486 ||  || — || August 24, 2001 || Anderson Mesa || LONEOS || V || align=right | 1.4 km || 
|-id=487 bgcolor=#d6d6d6
| 109487 ||  || — || August 24, 2001 || Anderson Mesa || LONEOS || — || align=right | 5.5 km || 
|-id=488 bgcolor=#fefefe
| 109488 ||  || — || August 24, 2001 || Socorro || LINEAR || NYS || align=right | 1.4 km || 
|-id=489 bgcolor=#d6d6d6
| 109489 ||  || — || August 24, 2001 || Anderson Mesa || LONEOS || — || align=right | 7.7 km || 
|-id=490 bgcolor=#E9E9E9
| 109490 ||  || — || August 24, 2001 || Anderson Mesa || LONEOS || — || align=right | 4.9 km || 
|-id=491 bgcolor=#d6d6d6
| 109491 ||  || — || August 24, 2001 || Anderson Mesa || LONEOS || — || align=right | 5.5 km || 
|-id=492 bgcolor=#fefefe
| 109492 ||  || — || August 24, 2001 || Anderson Mesa || LONEOS || — || align=right | 1.7 km || 
|-id=493 bgcolor=#d6d6d6
| 109493 ||  || — || August 24, 2001 || Anderson Mesa || LONEOS || ALA || align=right | 6.4 km || 
|-id=494 bgcolor=#E9E9E9
| 109494 ||  || — || August 24, 2001 || Anderson Mesa || LONEOS || — || align=right | 4.7 km || 
|-id=495 bgcolor=#d6d6d6
| 109495 ||  || — || August 24, 2001 || Anderson Mesa || LONEOS || — || align=right | 4.3 km || 
|-id=496 bgcolor=#d6d6d6
| 109496 ||  || — || August 24, 2001 || Anderson Mesa || LONEOS || — || align=right | 4.5 km || 
|-id=497 bgcolor=#d6d6d6
| 109497 ||  || — || August 24, 2001 || Anderson Mesa || LONEOS || VER || align=right | 6.2 km || 
|-id=498 bgcolor=#d6d6d6
| 109498 ||  || — || August 24, 2001 || Anderson Mesa || LONEOS || AEG || align=right | 7.7 km || 
|-id=499 bgcolor=#E9E9E9
| 109499 ||  || — || August 24, 2001 || Anderson Mesa || LONEOS || KRM || align=right | 4.3 km || 
|-id=500 bgcolor=#d6d6d6
| 109500 ||  || — || August 24, 2001 || Anderson Mesa || LONEOS || — || align=right | 5.3 km || 
|}

109501–109600 

|-bgcolor=#fefefe
| 109501 ||  || — || August 24, 2001 || Desert Eagle || W. K. Y. Yeung || NYS || align=right | 1.5 km || 
|-id=502 bgcolor=#d6d6d6
| 109502 ||  || — || August 24, 2001 || Desert Eagle || W. K. Y. Yeung || THM || align=right | 4.4 km || 
|-id=503 bgcolor=#E9E9E9
| 109503 ||  || — || August 24, 2001 || Socorro || LINEAR || — || align=right | 3.3 km || 
|-id=504 bgcolor=#fefefe
| 109504 ||  || — || August 24, 2001 || Socorro || LINEAR || — || align=right | 1.8 km || 
|-id=505 bgcolor=#E9E9E9
| 109505 ||  || — || August 24, 2001 || Socorro || LINEAR || — || align=right | 2.7 km || 
|-id=506 bgcolor=#d6d6d6
| 109506 ||  || — || August 24, 2001 || Socorro || LINEAR || EOS || align=right | 4.0 km || 
|-id=507 bgcolor=#d6d6d6
| 109507 ||  || — || August 24, 2001 || Socorro || LINEAR || THM || align=right | 5.0 km || 
|-id=508 bgcolor=#d6d6d6
| 109508 ||  || — || August 24, 2001 || Socorro || LINEAR || — || align=right | 5.2 km || 
|-id=509 bgcolor=#E9E9E9
| 109509 ||  || — || August 24, 2001 || Socorro || LINEAR || — || align=right | 2.5 km || 
|-id=510 bgcolor=#fefefe
| 109510 ||  || — || August 24, 2001 || Socorro || LINEAR || MAS || align=right | 1.5 km || 
|-id=511 bgcolor=#d6d6d6
| 109511 ||  || — || August 24, 2001 || Socorro || LINEAR || — || align=right | 4.7 km || 
|-id=512 bgcolor=#fefefe
| 109512 ||  || — || August 24, 2001 || Socorro || LINEAR || ERI || align=right | 5.0 km || 
|-id=513 bgcolor=#d6d6d6
| 109513 ||  || — || August 24, 2001 || Socorro || LINEAR || — || align=right | 4.2 km || 
|-id=514 bgcolor=#E9E9E9
| 109514 ||  || — || August 24, 2001 || Socorro || LINEAR || — || align=right | 1.7 km || 
|-id=515 bgcolor=#fefefe
| 109515 ||  || — || August 24, 2001 || Socorro || LINEAR || — || align=right | 1.9 km || 
|-id=516 bgcolor=#d6d6d6
| 109516 ||  || — || August 24, 2001 || Socorro || LINEAR || THM || align=right | 5.7 km || 
|-id=517 bgcolor=#d6d6d6
| 109517 ||  || — || August 24, 2001 || Socorro || LINEAR || — || align=right | 5.2 km || 
|-id=518 bgcolor=#E9E9E9
| 109518 ||  || — || August 24, 2001 || Socorro || LINEAR || — || align=right | 1.8 km || 
|-id=519 bgcolor=#d6d6d6
| 109519 ||  || — || August 24, 2001 || Socorro || LINEAR || — || align=right | 8.0 km || 
|-id=520 bgcolor=#E9E9E9
| 109520 ||  || — || August 24, 2001 || Socorro || LINEAR || — || align=right | 2.5 km || 
|-id=521 bgcolor=#fefefe
| 109521 ||  || — || August 24, 2001 || Socorro || LINEAR || V || align=right | 1.6 km || 
|-id=522 bgcolor=#d6d6d6
| 109522 ||  || — || August 24, 2001 || Kitt Peak || Spacewatch || EOS || align=right | 5.5 km || 
|-id=523 bgcolor=#E9E9E9
| 109523 ||  || — || August 24, 2001 || Socorro || LINEAR || — || align=right | 3.1 km || 
|-id=524 bgcolor=#E9E9E9
| 109524 ||  || — || August 24, 2001 || Socorro || LINEAR || — || align=right | 3.1 km || 
|-id=525 bgcolor=#E9E9E9
| 109525 ||  || — || August 24, 2001 || Socorro || LINEAR || MAR || align=right | 2.1 km || 
|-id=526 bgcolor=#E9E9E9
| 109526 ||  || — || August 24, 2001 || Socorro || LINEAR || — || align=right | 4.1 km || 
|-id=527 bgcolor=#E9E9E9
| 109527 ||  || — || August 24, 2001 || Socorro || LINEAR || VIB || align=right | 5.7 km || 
|-id=528 bgcolor=#E9E9E9
| 109528 ||  || — || August 24, 2001 || Socorro || LINEAR || — || align=right | 3.1 km || 
|-id=529 bgcolor=#E9E9E9
| 109529 ||  || — || August 24, 2001 || Socorro || LINEAR || — || align=right | 1.9 km || 
|-id=530 bgcolor=#E9E9E9
| 109530 ||  || — || August 24, 2001 || Socorro || LINEAR || — || align=right | 3.3 km || 
|-id=531 bgcolor=#fefefe
| 109531 ||  || — || August 24, 2001 || Socorro || LINEAR || — || align=right | 2.0 km || 
|-id=532 bgcolor=#E9E9E9
| 109532 ||  || — || August 24, 2001 || Socorro || LINEAR || — || align=right | 2.7 km || 
|-id=533 bgcolor=#fefefe
| 109533 ||  || — || August 24, 2001 || Haleakala || NEAT || — || align=right | 2.0 km || 
|-id=534 bgcolor=#fefefe
| 109534 ||  || — || August 24, 2001 || Haleakala || NEAT || — || align=right | 2.8 km || 
|-id=535 bgcolor=#E9E9E9
| 109535 ||  || — || August 24, 2001 || Haleakala || NEAT || — || align=right | 2.4 km || 
|-id=536 bgcolor=#E9E9E9
| 109536 ||  || — || August 24, 2001 || Haleakala || NEAT || — || align=right | 2.0 km || 
|-id=537 bgcolor=#E9E9E9
| 109537 ||  || — || August 24, 2001 || Haleakala || NEAT || — || align=right | 1.8 km || 
|-id=538 bgcolor=#E9E9E9
| 109538 ||  || — || August 24, 2001 || Haleakala || NEAT || — || align=right | 3.3 km || 
|-id=539 bgcolor=#d6d6d6
| 109539 ||  || — || August 25, 2001 || Socorro || LINEAR || EOS || align=right | 3.5 km || 
|-id=540 bgcolor=#d6d6d6
| 109540 ||  || — || August 25, 2001 || Socorro || LINEAR || — || align=right | 4.7 km || 
|-id=541 bgcolor=#d6d6d6
| 109541 ||  || — || August 25, 2001 || Socorro || LINEAR || — || align=right | 6.3 km || 
|-id=542 bgcolor=#fefefe
| 109542 ||  || — || August 25, 2001 || Socorro || LINEAR || — || align=right | 1.4 km || 
|-id=543 bgcolor=#d6d6d6
| 109543 ||  || — || August 25, 2001 || Anderson Mesa || LONEOS || — || align=right | 6.4 km || 
|-id=544 bgcolor=#E9E9E9
| 109544 ||  || — || August 25, 2001 || Socorro || LINEAR || — || align=right | 3.9 km || 
|-id=545 bgcolor=#E9E9E9
| 109545 ||  || — || August 25, 2001 || Socorro || LINEAR || — || align=right | 1.6 km || 
|-id=546 bgcolor=#E9E9E9
| 109546 ||  || — || August 25, 2001 || Socorro || LINEAR || — || align=right | 2.4 km || 
|-id=547 bgcolor=#E9E9E9
| 109547 ||  || — || August 25, 2001 || Socorro || LINEAR || WIT || align=right | 2.5 km || 
|-id=548 bgcolor=#d6d6d6
| 109548 ||  || — || August 25, 2001 || Socorro || LINEAR || — || align=right | 4.4 km || 
|-id=549 bgcolor=#C2FFFF
| 109549 ||  || — || August 25, 2001 || Socorro || LINEAR || L5 || align=right | 20 km || 
|-id=550 bgcolor=#E9E9E9
| 109550 ||  || — || August 25, 2001 || Socorro || LINEAR || EUN || align=right | 3.0 km || 
|-id=551 bgcolor=#fefefe
| 109551 ||  || — || August 25, 2001 || Socorro || LINEAR || — || align=right | 2.5 km || 
|-id=552 bgcolor=#d6d6d6
| 109552 ||  || — || August 25, 2001 || Socorro || LINEAR || — || align=right | 6.8 km || 
|-id=553 bgcolor=#d6d6d6
| 109553 ||  || — || August 25, 2001 || Socorro || LINEAR || EOS || align=right | 3.8 km || 
|-id=554 bgcolor=#d6d6d6
| 109554 ||  || — || August 25, 2001 || Socorro || LINEAR || — || align=right | 6.8 km || 
|-id=555 bgcolor=#E9E9E9
| 109555 ||  || — || August 25, 2001 || Socorro || LINEAR || HOF || align=right | 6.3 km || 
|-id=556 bgcolor=#fefefe
| 109556 ||  || — || August 25, 2001 || Socorro || LINEAR || — || align=right | 1.9 km || 
|-id=557 bgcolor=#E9E9E9
| 109557 ||  || — || August 25, 2001 || Socorro || LINEAR || MAR || align=right | 2.8 km || 
|-id=558 bgcolor=#E9E9E9
| 109558 ||  || — || August 25, 2001 || Socorro || LINEAR || — || align=right | 6.1 km || 
|-id=559 bgcolor=#E9E9E9
| 109559 ||  || — || August 25, 2001 || Socorro || LINEAR || — || align=right | 1.8 km || 
|-id=560 bgcolor=#d6d6d6
| 109560 ||  || — || August 25, 2001 || Socorro || LINEAR || — || align=right | 6.2 km || 
|-id=561 bgcolor=#E9E9E9
| 109561 ||  || — || August 25, 2001 || Socorro || LINEAR || — || align=right | 2.9 km || 
|-id=562 bgcolor=#d6d6d6
| 109562 ||  || — || August 25, 2001 || Anderson Mesa || LONEOS || — || align=right | 5.3 km || 
|-id=563 bgcolor=#E9E9E9
| 109563 ||  || — || August 25, 2001 || Anderson Mesa || LONEOS || MAR || align=right | 2.6 km || 
|-id=564 bgcolor=#E9E9E9
| 109564 ||  || — || August 26, 2001 || Črni Vrh || Črni Vrh || — || align=right | 2.7 km || 
|-id=565 bgcolor=#E9E9E9
| 109565 ||  || — || August 26, 2001 || Anderson Mesa || LONEOS || HNS || align=right | 2.3 km || 
|-id=566 bgcolor=#E9E9E9
| 109566 ||  || — || August 26, 2001 || Anderson Mesa || LONEOS || — || align=right | 3.0 km || 
|-id=567 bgcolor=#fefefe
| 109567 ||  || — || August 20, 2001 || Socorro || LINEAR || — || align=right | 2.8 km || 
|-id=568 bgcolor=#E9E9E9
| 109568 ||  || — || August 20, 2001 || Socorro || LINEAR || — || align=right | 2.9 km || 
|-id=569 bgcolor=#d6d6d6
| 109569 ||  || — || August 20, 2001 || Palomar || NEAT || — || align=right | 8.7 km || 
|-id=570 bgcolor=#d6d6d6
| 109570 ||  || — || August 20, 2001 || Socorro || LINEAR || — || align=right | 5.1 km || 
|-id=571 bgcolor=#E9E9E9
| 109571 ||  || — || August 20, 2001 || Palomar || NEAT || — || align=right | 3.7 km || 
|-id=572 bgcolor=#d6d6d6
| 109572 ||  || — || August 20, 2001 || Haleakala || NEAT || — || align=right | 6.5 km || 
|-id=573 bgcolor=#E9E9E9
| 109573 Mishasmirnov ||  ||  || August 20, 2001 || Crimea-Simeis || Crimean Astrophysical Obs. || — || align=right | 2.9 km || 
|-id=574 bgcolor=#fefefe
| 109574 ||  || — || August 19, 2001 || Socorro || LINEAR || — || align=right | 3.4 km || 
|-id=575 bgcolor=#E9E9E9
| 109575 ||  || — || August 19, 2001 || Socorro || LINEAR || — || align=right | 4.3 km || 
|-id=576 bgcolor=#E9E9E9
| 109576 ||  || — || August 19, 2001 || Socorro || LINEAR || GEF || align=right | 2.4 km || 
|-id=577 bgcolor=#fefefe
| 109577 ||  || — || August 19, 2001 || Socorro || LINEAR || V || align=right | 1.6 km || 
|-id=578 bgcolor=#d6d6d6
| 109578 ||  || — || August 19, 2001 || Socorro || LINEAR || — || align=right | 6.2 km || 
|-id=579 bgcolor=#fefefe
| 109579 ||  || — || August 19, 2001 || Socorro || LINEAR || — || align=right | 3.7 km || 
|-id=580 bgcolor=#E9E9E9
| 109580 ||  || — || August 19, 2001 || Socorro || LINEAR || — || align=right | 4.1 km || 
|-id=581 bgcolor=#d6d6d6
| 109581 ||  || — || August 19, 2001 || Socorro || LINEAR || 7:4 || align=right | 8.5 km || 
|-id=582 bgcolor=#d6d6d6
| 109582 ||  || — || August 19, 2001 || Anderson Mesa || LONEOS || ALA || align=right | 12 km || 
|-id=583 bgcolor=#d6d6d6
| 109583 ||  || — || August 19, 2001 || Haleakala || NEAT || EOS || align=right | 5.4 km || 
|-id=584 bgcolor=#d6d6d6
| 109584 ||  || — || August 19, 2001 || Socorro || LINEAR || — || align=right | 4.0 km || 
|-id=585 bgcolor=#E9E9E9
| 109585 ||  || — || August 19, 2001 || Socorro || LINEAR || — || align=right | 1.8 km || 
|-id=586 bgcolor=#d6d6d6
| 109586 ||  || — || August 19, 2001 || Socorro || LINEAR || EOS || align=right | 3.6 km || 
|-id=587 bgcolor=#d6d6d6
| 109587 ||  || — || August 19, 2001 || Socorro || LINEAR || slow || align=right | 7.6 km || 
|-id=588 bgcolor=#E9E9E9
| 109588 ||  || — || August 19, 2001 || Socorro || LINEAR || — || align=right | 2.0 km || 
|-id=589 bgcolor=#E9E9E9
| 109589 ||  || — || August 19, 2001 || Socorro || LINEAR || — || align=right | 1.8 km || 
|-id=590 bgcolor=#d6d6d6
| 109590 ||  || — || August 19, 2001 || Socorro || LINEAR || — || align=right | 5.7 km || 
|-id=591 bgcolor=#d6d6d6
| 109591 ||  || — || August 19, 2001 || Socorro || LINEAR || — || align=right | 3.9 km || 
|-id=592 bgcolor=#d6d6d6
| 109592 ||  || — || August 19, 2001 || Socorro || LINEAR || — || align=right | 6.5 km || 
|-id=593 bgcolor=#E9E9E9
| 109593 ||  || — || August 19, 2001 || Socorro || LINEAR || — || align=right | 1.5 km || 
|-id=594 bgcolor=#d6d6d6
| 109594 ||  || — || August 19, 2001 || Socorro || LINEAR || — || align=right | 5.9 km || 
|-id=595 bgcolor=#d6d6d6
| 109595 ||  || — || August 19, 2001 || Socorro || LINEAR || THB || align=right | 8.2 km || 
|-id=596 bgcolor=#E9E9E9
| 109596 ||  || — || August 19, 2001 || Socorro || LINEAR || — || align=right | 3.6 km || 
|-id=597 bgcolor=#E9E9E9
| 109597 ||  || — || August 19, 2001 || Socorro || LINEAR || — || align=right | 2.4 km || 
|-id=598 bgcolor=#fefefe
| 109598 ||  || — || August 19, 2001 || Anderson Mesa || LONEOS || H || align=right | 1.3 km || 
|-id=599 bgcolor=#d6d6d6
| 109599 ||  || — || August 19, 2001 || Anderson Mesa || LONEOS || FIR || align=right | 7.9 km || 
|-id=600 bgcolor=#E9E9E9
| 109600 ||  || — || August 19, 2001 || Socorro || LINEAR || — || align=right | 1.9 km || 
|}

109601–109700 

|-bgcolor=#E9E9E9
| 109601 ||  || — || August 19, 2001 || Anderson Mesa || LONEOS || — || align=right | 2.7 km || 
|-id=602 bgcolor=#E9E9E9
| 109602 ||  || — || August 19, 2001 || Anderson Mesa || LONEOS || MAR || align=right | 2.8 km || 
|-id=603 bgcolor=#fefefe
| 109603 ||  || — || August 18, 2001 || Palomar || NEAT || PHO || align=right | 3.4 km || 
|-id=604 bgcolor=#E9E9E9
| 109604 ||  || — || August 18, 2001 || Anderson Mesa || LONEOS || — || align=right | 6.4 km || 
|-id=605 bgcolor=#E9E9E9
| 109605 ||  || — || August 18, 2001 || Anderson Mesa || LONEOS || — || align=right | 3.2 km || 
|-id=606 bgcolor=#fefefe
| 109606 ||  || — || August 23, 2001 || Haleakala || NEAT || MAS || align=right | 1.5 km || 
|-id=607 bgcolor=#E9E9E9
| 109607 ||  || — || August 23, 2001 || Haleakala || NEAT || — || align=right | 1.9 km || 
|-id=608 bgcolor=#E9E9E9
| 109608 ||  || — || August 17, 2001 || Socorro || LINEAR || — || align=right | 1.8 km || 
|-id=609 bgcolor=#E9E9E9
| 109609 ||  || — || August 17, 2001 || Socorro || LINEAR || — || align=right | 3.0 km || 
|-id=610 bgcolor=#d6d6d6
| 109610 ||  || — || August 16, 2001 || Socorro || LINEAR || HYG || align=right | 7.5 km || 
|-id=611 bgcolor=#fefefe
| 109611 ||  || — || August 16, 2001 || Socorro || LINEAR || MAS || align=right | 1.4 km || 
|-id=612 bgcolor=#d6d6d6
| 109612 ||  || — || August 16, 2001 || Socorro || LINEAR || HIL3:2 || align=right | 9.0 km || 
|-id=613 bgcolor=#fefefe
| 109613 ||  || — || August 16, 2001 || Socorro || LINEAR || — || align=right | 1.5 km || 
|-id=614 bgcolor=#fefefe
| 109614 ||  || — || August 16, 2001 || Socorro || LINEAR || NYS || align=right | 1.0 km || 
|-id=615 bgcolor=#d6d6d6
| 109615 ||  || — || August 16, 2001 || Socorro || LINEAR || — || align=right | 3.4 km || 
|-id=616 bgcolor=#E9E9E9
| 109616 ||  || — || August 16, 2001 || Socorro || LINEAR || — || align=right | 3.0 km || 
|-id=617 bgcolor=#d6d6d6
| 109617 ||  || — || August 16, 2001 || Palomar || NEAT || — || align=right | 5.2 km || 
|-id=618 bgcolor=#E9E9E9
| 109618 ||  || — || August 25, 2001 || Bergisch Gladbach || W. Bickel || — || align=right | 2.2 km || 
|-id=619 bgcolor=#d6d6d6
| 109619 ||  || — || August 24, 2001 || Anderson Mesa || LONEOS || — || align=right | 6.4 km || 
|-id=620 bgcolor=#fefefe
| 109620 ||  || — || August 24, 2001 || Anderson Mesa || LONEOS || MAS || align=right | 1.3 km || 
|-id=621 bgcolor=#E9E9E9
| 109621 ||  || — || August 24, 2001 || Anderson Mesa || LONEOS || — || align=right | 2.1 km || 
|-id=622 bgcolor=#E9E9E9
| 109622 ||  || — || August 24, 2001 || Anderson Mesa || LONEOS || ADE || align=right | 4.9 km || 
|-id=623 bgcolor=#E9E9E9
| 109623 ||  || — || August 24, 2001 || Socorro || LINEAR || — || align=right | 5.0 km || 
|-id=624 bgcolor=#E9E9E9
| 109624 ||  || — || August 24, 2001 || Socorro || LINEAR || — || align=right | 4.8 km || 
|-id=625 bgcolor=#E9E9E9
| 109625 ||  || — || August 24, 2001 || Socorro || LINEAR || — || align=right | 4.5 km || 
|-id=626 bgcolor=#E9E9E9
| 109626 ||  || — || August 24, 2001 || Socorro || LINEAR || ADE || align=right | 3.7 km || 
|-id=627 bgcolor=#d6d6d6
| 109627 ||  || — || August 24, 2001 || Anderson Mesa || LONEOS || — || align=right | 3.7 km || 
|-id=628 bgcolor=#E9E9E9
| 109628 ||  || — || August 27, 2001 || Anderson Mesa || LONEOS || — || align=right | 5.4 km || 
|-id=629 bgcolor=#d6d6d6
| 109629 ||  || — || August 27, 2001 || Anderson Mesa || LONEOS || EOS || align=right | 6.3 km || 
|-id=630 bgcolor=#E9E9E9
| 109630 ||  || — || August 27, 2001 || Anderson Mesa || LONEOS || EUN || align=right | 2.6 km || 
|-id=631 bgcolor=#d6d6d6
| 109631 ||  || — || August 23, 2001 || Palomar || NEAT || — || align=right | 5.5 km || 
|-id=632 bgcolor=#fefefe
| 109632 ||  || — || August 25, 2001 || Palomar || NEAT || — || align=right | 1.9 km || 
|-id=633 bgcolor=#d6d6d6
| 109633 ||  || — || August 29, 2001 || Palomar || NEAT || VER || align=right | 7.1 km || 
|-id=634 bgcolor=#d6d6d6
| 109634 ||  || — || August 29, 2001 || Palomar || NEAT || — || align=right | 5.6 km || 
|-id=635 bgcolor=#E9E9E9
| 109635 ||  || — || August 17, 2001 || Socorro || LINEAR || — || align=right | 3.6 km || 
|-id=636 bgcolor=#E9E9E9
| 109636 ||  || — || August 25, 2001 || Anderson Mesa || LONEOS || GEF || align=right | 2.6 km || 
|-id=637 bgcolor=#d6d6d6
| 109637 ||  || — || August 27, 2001 || Anderson Mesa || LONEOS || — || align=right | 4.9 km || 
|-id=638 bgcolor=#d6d6d6
| 109638 ||  || — || August 27, 2001 || Anderson Mesa || LONEOS || EOS || align=right | 3.2 km || 
|-id=639 bgcolor=#E9E9E9
| 109639 || 2001 RA || — || September 2, 2001 || Farpoint || G. Hug || HNS || align=right | 2.8 km || 
|-id=640 bgcolor=#E9E9E9
| 109640 || 2001 RJ || — || September 6, 2001 || Socorro || LINEAR || PAL || align=right | 7.2 km || 
|-id=641 bgcolor=#d6d6d6
| 109641 || 2001 RQ || — || September 7, 2001 || Socorro || LINEAR || EUP || align=right | 12 km || 
|-id=642 bgcolor=#fefefe
| 109642 ||  || — || September 7, 2001 || Socorro || LINEAR || MAS || align=right | 1.2 km || 
|-id=643 bgcolor=#d6d6d6
| 109643 ||  || — || September 7, 2001 || Socorro || LINEAR || — || align=right | 7.0 km || 
|-id=644 bgcolor=#E9E9E9
| 109644 ||  || — || September 9, 2001 || Prescott || P. G. Comba || — || align=right | 1.7 km || 
|-id=645 bgcolor=#fefefe
| 109645 ||  || — || September 8, 2001 || Anderson Mesa || LONEOS || — || align=right | 1.9 km || 
|-id=646 bgcolor=#E9E9E9
| 109646 ||  || — || September 7, 2001 || Socorro || LINEAR || — || align=right | 4.5 km || 
|-id=647 bgcolor=#E9E9E9
| 109647 ||  || — || September 8, 2001 || Socorro || LINEAR || — || align=right | 2.6 km || 
|-id=648 bgcolor=#E9E9E9
| 109648 ||  || — || September 8, 2001 || Socorro || LINEAR || — || align=right | 3.1 km || 
|-id=649 bgcolor=#E9E9E9
| 109649 ||  || — || September 8, 2001 || Socorro || LINEAR || — || align=right | 2.6 km || 
|-id=650 bgcolor=#E9E9E9
| 109650 ||  || — || September 10, 2001 || Desert Eagle || W. K. Y. Yeung || NEM || align=right | 4.9 km || 
|-id=651 bgcolor=#E9E9E9
| 109651 ||  || — || September 10, 2001 || Desert Eagle || W. K. Y. Yeung || EUN || align=right | 2.0 km || 
|-id=652 bgcolor=#E9E9E9
| 109652 ||  || — || September 10, 2001 || Desert Eagle || W. K. Y. Yeung || — || align=right | 2.0 km || 
|-id=653 bgcolor=#fefefe
| 109653 ||  || — || September 8, 2001 || Socorro || LINEAR || — || align=right | 3.4 km || 
|-id=654 bgcolor=#E9E9E9
| 109654 ||  || — || September 9, 2001 || Socorro || LINEAR || — || align=right | 2.5 km || 
|-id=655 bgcolor=#E9E9E9
| 109655 ||  || — || September 9, 2001 || Socorro || LINEAR || — || align=right | 5.1 km || 
|-id=656 bgcolor=#d6d6d6
| 109656 ||  || — || September 7, 2001 || Socorro || LINEAR || KOR || align=right | 3.0 km || 
|-id=657 bgcolor=#E9E9E9
| 109657 ||  || — || September 11, 2001 || Fountain Hills || C. W. Juels || — || align=right | 4.9 km || 
|-id=658 bgcolor=#d6d6d6
| 109658 ||  || — || September 11, 2001 || San Marcello || A. Boattini, L. Tesi || — || align=right | 5.7 km || 
|-id=659 bgcolor=#d6d6d6
| 109659 ||  || — || September 10, 2001 || Desert Eagle || W. K. Y. Yeung || 7:4 || align=right | 10 km || 
|-id=660 bgcolor=#d6d6d6
| 109660 ||  || — || September 10, 2001 || Socorro || LINEAR || — || align=right | 4.7 km || 
|-id=661 bgcolor=#E9E9E9
| 109661 ||  || — || September 12, 2001 || Prescott || P. G. Comba || — || align=right | 1.7 km || 
|-id=662 bgcolor=#d6d6d6
| 109662 ||  || — || September 7, 2001 || Socorro || LINEAR || — || align=right | 4.2 km || 
|-id=663 bgcolor=#d6d6d6
| 109663 ||  || — || September 7, 2001 || Socorro || LINEAR || — || align=right | 6.5 km || 
|-id=664 bgcolor=#E9E9E9
| 109664 ||  || — || September 7, 2001 || Socorro || LINEAR || — || align=right | 2.3 km || 
|-id=665 bgcolor=#E9E9E9
| 109665 ||  || — || September 7, 2001 || Socorro || LINEAR || — || align=right | 1.8 km || 
|-id=666 bgcolor=#d6d6d6
| 109666 ||  || — || September 7, 2001 || Socorro || LINEAR || — || align=right | 4.5 km || 
|-id=667 bgcolor=#E9E9E9
| 109667 ||  || — || September 7, 2001 || Socorro || LINEAR || — || align=right | 2.7 km || 
|-id=668 bgcolor=#E9E9E9
| 109668 ||  || — || September 7, 2001 || Socorro || LINEAR || VIB || align=right | 4.3 km || 
|-id=669 bgcolor=#E9E9E9
| 109669 ||  || — || September 7, 2001 || Socorro || LINEAR || — || align=right | 1.8 km || 
|-id=670 bgcolor=#E9E9E9
| 109670 ||  || — || September 7, 2001 || Socorro || LINEAR || — || align=right | 2.8 km || 
|-id=671 bgcolor=#fefefe
| 109671 ||  || — || September 7, 2001 || Socorro || LINEAR || NYS || align=right | 1.8 km || 
|-id=672 bgcolor=#E9E9E9
| 109672 ||  || — || September 7, 2001 || Socorro || LINEAR || — || align=right | 1.8 km || 
|-id=673 bgcolor=#E9E9E9
| 109673 ||  || — || September 7, 2001 || Socorro || LINEAR || — || align=right | 1.9 km || 
|-id=674 bgcolor=#E9E9E9
| 109674 ||  || — || September 7, 2001 || Socorro || LINEAR || — || align=right | 1.4 km || 
|-id=675 bgcolor=#E9E9E9
| 109675 ||  || — || September 7, 2001 || Socorro || LINEAR || — || align=right | 2.5 km || 
|-id=676 bgcolor=#E9E9E9
| 109676 ||  || — || September 7, 2001 || Socorro || LINEAR || — || align=right | 1.9 km || 
|-id=677 bgcolor=#E9E9E9
| 109677 ||  || — || September 7, 2001 || Socorro || LINEAR || — || align=right | 1.6 km || 
|-id=678 bgcolor=#E9E9E9
| 109678 ||  || — || September 7, 2001 || Socorro || LINEAR || — || align=right | 2.9 km || 
|-id=679 bgcolor=#E9E9E9
| 109679 ||  || — || September 7, 2001 || Socorro || LINEAR || — || align=right | 1.9 km || 
|-id=680 bgcolor=#d6d6d6
| 109680 ||  || — || September 7, 2001 || Socorro || LINEAR || THM || align=right | 5.2 km || 
|-id=681 bgcolor=#d6d6d6
| 109681 ||  || — || September 7, 2001 || Socorro || LINEAR || — || align=right | 5.5 km || 
|-id=682 bgcolor=#d6d6d6
| 109682 ||  || — || September 7, 2001 || Socorro || LINEAR || EOS || align=right | 3.6 km || 
|-id=683 bgcolor=#E9E9E9
| 109683 ||  || — || September 7, 2001 || Socorro || LINEAR || — || align=right | 3.2 km || 
|-id=684 bgcolor=#E9E9E9
| 109684 ||  || — || September 7, 2001 || Socorro || LINEAR || — || align=right | 1.5 km || 
|-id=685 bgcolor=#d6d6d6
| 109685 ||  || — || September 7, 2001 || Socorro || LINEAR || — || align=right | 3.4 km || 
|-id=686 bgcolor=#d6d6d6
| 109686 ||  || — || September 7, 2001 || Socorro || LINEAR || — || align=right | 5.5 km || 
|-id=687 bgcolor=#d6d6d6
| 109687 ||  || — || September 8, 2001 || Socorro || LINEAR || HYG || align=right | 4.7 km || 
|-id=688 bgcolor=#d6d6d6
| 109688 ||  || — || September 8, 2001 || Socorro || LINEAR || — || align=right | 5.2 km || 
|-id=689 bgcolor=#E9E9E9
| 109689 ||  || — || September 8, 2001 || Socorro || LINEAR || MAR || align=right | 1.9 km || 
|-id=690 bgcolor=#d6d6d6
| 109690 ||  || — || September 8, 2001 || Socorro || LINEAR || — || align=right | 2.5 km || 
|-id=691 bgcolor=#d6d6d6
| 109691 ||  || — || September 8, 2001 || Socorro || LINEAR || — || align=right | 6.0 km || 
|-id=692 bgcolor=#E9E9E9
| 109692 ||  || — || September 8, 2001 || Socorro || LINEAR || — || align=right | 2.3 km || 
|-id=693 bgcolor=#d6d6d6
| 109693 ||  || — || September 8, 2001 || Socorro || LINEAR || — || align=right | 4.0 km || 
|-id=694 bgcolor=#E9E9E9
| 109694 ||  || — || September 8, 2001 || Socorro || LINEAR || — || align=right | 1.8 km || 
|-id=695 bgcolor=#d6d6d6
| 109695 ||  || — || September 8, 2001 || Socorro || LINEAR || — || align=right | 6.0 km || 
|-id=696 bgcolor=#E9E9E9
| 109696 ||  || — || September 8, 2001 || Socorro || LINEAR || MAR || align=right | 2.1 km || 
|-id=697 bgcolor=#E9E9E9
| 109697 ||  || — || September 8, 2001 || Socorro || LINEAR || — || align=right | 3.0 km || 
|-id=698 bgcolor=#E9E9E9
| 109698 ||  || — || September 9, 2001 || Socorro || LINEAR || — || align=right | 2.1 km || 
|-id=699 bgcolor=#d6d6d6
| 109699 ||  || — || September 10, 2001 || Socorro || LINEAR || URS || align=right | 8.2 km || 
|-id=700 bgcolor=#d6d6d6
| 109700 ||  || — || September 11, 2001 || Socorro || LINEAR || — || align=right | 7.1 km || 
|}

109701–109800 

|-bgcolor=#E9E9E9
| 109701 ||  || — || September 11, 2001 || Socorro || LINEAR || — || align=right | 6.5 km || 
|-id=702 bgcolor=#E9E9E9
| 109702 ||  || — || September 11, 2001 || Socorro || LINEAR || PAD || align=right | 2.7 km || 
|-id=703 bgcolor=#d6d6d6
| 109703 ||  || — || September 11, 2001 || Socorro || LINEAR || — || align=right | 5.1 km || 
|-id=704 bgcolor=#d6d6d6
| 109704 ||  || — || September 11, 2001 || Socorro || LINEAR || EOS || align=right | 4.4 km || 
|-id=705 bgcolor=#E9E9E9
| 109705 ||  || — || September 9, 2001 || Palomar || NEAT || — || align=right | 1.9 km || 
|-id=706 bgcolor=#E9E9E9
| 109706 ||  || — || September 10, 2001 || Desert Eagle || W. K. Y. Yeung || — || align=right | 2.0 km || 
|-id=707 bgcolor=#E9E9E9
| 109707 ||  || — || September 12, 2001 || Palomar || NEAT || EUN || align=right | 2.9 km || 
|-id=708 bgcolor=#E9E9E9
| 109708 ||  || — || September 12, 2001 || Palomar || NEAT || EUN || align=right | 2.5 km || 
|-id=709 bgcolor=#E9E9E9
| 109709 ||  || — || September 12, 2001 || Palomar || NEAT || — || align=right | 3.6 km || 
|-id=710 bgcolor=#E9E9E9
| 109710 ||  || — || September 14, 2001 || Palomar || NEAT || — || align=right | 2.1 km || 
|-id=711 bgcolor=#E9E9E9
| 109711 ||  || — || September 14, 2001 || Palomar || NEAT || — || align=right | 5.1 km || 
|-id=712 bgcolor=#E9E9E9
| 109712 Giger ||  ||  || September 12, 2001 || Goodricke-Pigott || R. A. Tucker || JUN || align=right | 1.6 km || 
|-id=713 bgcolor=#E9E9E9
| 109713 ||  || — || September 15, 2001 || Bisei SG Center || BATTeRS || EUN || align=right | 3.5 km || 
|-id=714 bgcolor=#d6d6d6
| 109714 ||  || — || September 11, 2001 || Desert Eagle || W. K. Y. Yeung || — || align=right | 6.2 km || 
|-id=715 bgcolor=#d6d6d6
| 109715 ||  || — || September 10, 2001 || Socorro || LINEAR || — || align=right | 4.4 km || 
|-id=716 bgcolor=#d6d6d6
| 109716 ||  || — || September 10, 2001 || Socorro || LINEAR || EOS || align=right | 3.0 km || 
|-id=717 bgcolor=#E9E9E9
| 109717 ||  || — || September 11, 2001 || Socorro || LINEAR || KON || align=right | 4.5 km || 
|-id=718 bgcolor=#E9E9E9
| 109718 ||  || — || September 12, 2001 || Socorro || LINEAR || — || align=right | 6.5 km || 
|-id=719 bgcolor=#E9E9E9
| 109719 ||  || — || September 12, 2001 || Socorro || LINEAR || — || align=right | 4.7 km || 
|-id=720 bgcolor=#d6d6d6
| 109720 ||  || — || September 12, 2001 || Socorro || LINEAR || NAE || align=right | 4.8 km || 
|-id=721 bgcolor=#fefefe
| 109721 ||  || — || September 12, 2001 || Socorro || LINEAR || — || align=right | 2.0 km || 
|-id=722 bgcolor=#d6d6d6
| 109722 ||  || — || September 12, 2001 || Socorro || LINEAR || — || align=right | 4.0 km || 
|-id=723 bgcolor=#d6d6d6
| 109723 ||  || — || September 12, 2001 || Socorro || LINEAR || — || align=right | 5.2 km || 
|-id=724 bgcolor=#fefefe
| 109724 ||  || — || September 12, 2001 || Socorro || LINEAR || — || align=right | 1.8 km || 
|-id=725 bgcolor=#E9E9E9
| 109725 ||  || — || September 12, 2001 || Socorro || LINEAR || — || align=right | 2.1 km || 
|-id=726 bgcolor=#E9E9E9
| 109726 ||  || — || September 12, 2001 || Socorro || LINEAR || — || align=right | 1.7 km || 
|-id=727 bgcolor=#d6d6d6
| 109727 ||  || — || September 12, 2001 || Socorro || LINEAR || — || align=right | 5.8 km || 
|-id=728 bgcolor=#fefefe
| 109728 ||  || — || September 12, 2001 || Socorro || LINEAR || — || align=right | 1.5 km || 
|-id=729 bgcolor=#E9E9E9
| 109729 ||  || — || September 12, 2001 || Socorro || LINEAR || — || align=right | 2.0 km || 
|-id=730 bgcolor=#fefefe
| 109730 ||  || — || September 12, 2001 || Socorro || LINEAR || — || align=right | 1.6 km || 
|-id=731 bgcolor=#E9E9E9
| 109731 ||  || — || September 12, 2001 || Socorro || LINEAR || — || align=right | 2.4 km || 
|-id=732 bgcolor=#d6d6d6
| 109732 ||  || — || September 12, 2001 || Socorro || LINEAR || HYG || align=right | 7.7 km || 
|-id=733 bgcolor=#d6d6d6
| 109733 ||  || — || September 12, 2001 || Socorro || LINEAR || HYG || align=right | 7.1 km || 
|-id=734 bgcolor=#E9E9E9
| 109734 ||  || — || September 12, 2001 || Socorro || LINEAR || — || align=right | 2.5 km || 
|-id=735 bgcolor=#d6d6d6
| 109735 ||  || — || September 12, 2001 || Socorro || LINEAR || — || align=right | 7.7 km || 
|-id=736 bgcolor=#E9E9E9
| 109736 ||  || — || September 12, 2001 || Socorro || LINEAR || — || align=right | 2.4 km || 
|-id=737 bgcolor=#d6d6d6
| 109737 ||  || — || September 12, 2001 || Socorro || LINEAR || BRA || align=right | 4.3 km || 
|-id=738 bgcolor=#d6d6d6
| 109738 ||  || — || September 11, 2001 || Anderson Mesa || LONEOS || — || align=right | 6.5 km || 
|-id=739 bgcolor=#d6d6d6
| 109739 ||  || — || September 11, 2001 || Anderson Mesa || LONEOS || — || align=right | 7.7 km || 
|-id=740 bgcolor=#E9E9E9
| 109740 ||  || — || September 10, 2001 || Socorro || LINEAR || — || align=right | 2.0 km || 
|-id=741 bgcolor=#d6d6d6
| 109741 ||  || — || September 10, 2001 || Socorro || LINEAR || — || align=right | 7.4 km || 
|-id=742 bgcolor=#E9E9E9
| 109742 ||  || — || September 10, 2001 || Socorro || LINEAR || — || align=right | 2.4 km || 
|-id=743 bgcolor=#E9E9E9
| 109743 ||  || — || September 10, 2001 || Socorro || LINEAR || — || align=right | 2.8 km || 
|-id=744 bgcolor=#E9E9E9
| 109744 ||  || — || September 10, 2001 || Socorro || LINEAR || — || align=right | 4.0 km || 
|-id=745 bgcolor=#fefefe
| 109745 ||  || — || September 10, 2001 || Socorro || LINEAR || V || align=right | 2.2 km || 
|-id=746 bgcolor=#E9E9E9
| 109746 ||  || — || September 10, 2001 || Socorro || LINEAR || — || align=right | 3.5 km || 
|-id=747 bgcolor=#E9E9E9
| 109747 ||  || — || September 10, 2001 || Socorro || LINEAR || MAR || align=right | 3.0 km || 
|-id=748 bgcolor=#E9E9E9
| 109748 ||  || — || September 10, 2001 || Socorro || LINEAR || — || align=right | 4.4 km || 
|-id=749 bgcolor=#d6d6d6
| 109749 ||  || — || September 10, 2001 || Socorro || LINEAR || EOS || align=right | 4.7 km || 
|-id=750 bgcolor=#E9E9E9
| 109750 ||  || — || September 10, 2001 || Socorro || LINEAR || — || align=right | 3.0 km || 
|-id=751 bgcolor=#E9E9E9
| 109751 ||  || — || September 10, 2001 || Socorro || LINEAR || — || align=right | 3.4 km || 
|-id=752 bgcolor=#E9E9E9
| 109752 ||  || — || September 10, 2001 || Socorro || LINEAR || ADE || align=right | 5.8 km || 
|-id=753 bgcolor=#d6d6d6
| 109753 ||  || — || September 10, 2001 || Socorro || LINEAR || — || align=right | 6.8 km || 
|-id=754 bgcolor=#E9E9E9
| 109754 ||  || — || September 10, 2001 || Socorro || LINEAR || — || align=right | 4.6 km || 
|-id=755 bgcolor=#E9E9E9
| 109755 ||  || — || September 10, 2001 || Socorro || LINEAR || — || align=right | 2.6 km || 
|-id=756 bgcolor=#E9E9E9
| 109756 ||  || — || September 10, 2001 || Socorro || LINEAR || — || align=right | 3.1 km || 
|-id=757 bgcolor=#E9E9E9
| 109757 ||  || — || September 10, 2001 || Socorro || LINEAR || — || align=right | 3.7 km || 
|-id=758 bgcolor=#E9E9E9
| 109758 ||  || — || September 10, 2001 || Socorro || LINEAR || — || align=right | 3.2 km || 
|-id=759 bgcolor=#d6d6d6
| 109759 ||  || — || September 10, 2001 || Socorro || LINEAR || HYG || align=right | 7.8 km || 
|-id=760 bgcolor=#E9E9E9
| 109760 ||  || — || September 10, 2001 || Socorro || LINEAR || — || align=right | 4.5 km || 
|-id=761 bgcolor=#E9E9E9
| 109761 ||  || — || September 10, 2001 || Socorro || LINEAR || — || align=right | 3.6 km || 
|-id=762 bgcolor=#E9E9E9
| 109762 ||  || — || September 10, 2001 || Socorro || LINEAR || — || align=right | 2.4 km || 
|-id=763 bgcolor=#E9E9E9
| 109763 ||  || — || September 10, 2001 || Socorro || LINEAR || — || align=right | 4.8 km || 
|-id=764 bgcolor=#E9E9E9
| 109764 ||  || — || September 10, 2001 || Socorro || LINEAR || — || align=right | 2.9 km || 
|-id=765 bgcolor=#d6d6d6
| 109765 ||  || — || September 10, 2001 || Socorro || LINEAR || — || align=right | 5.5 km || 
|-id=766 bgcolor=#E9E9E9
| 109766 ||  || — || September 10, 2001 || Socorro || LINEAR || — || align=right | 4.8 km || 
|-id=767 bgcolor=#d6d6d6
| 109767 ||  || — || September 10, 2001 || Socorro || LINEAR || — || align=right | 9.0 km || 
|-id=768 bgcolor=#d6d6d6
| 109768 ||  || — || September 10, 2001 || Socorro || LINEAR || URS || align=right | 8.0 km || 
|-id=769 bgcolor=#fefefe
| 109769 ||  || — || September 10, 2001 || Socorro || LINEAR || — || align=right | 1.8 km || 
|-id=770 bgcolor=#E9E9E9
| 109770 ||  || — || September 10, 2001 || Socorro || LINEAR || — || align=right | 4.2 km || 
|-id=771 bgcolor=#E9E9E9
| 109771 ||  || — || September 10, 2001 || Socorro || LINEAR || — || align=right | 3.2 km || 
|-id=772 bgcolor=#E9E9E9
| 109772 ||  || — || September 10, 2001 || Socorro || LINEAR || — || align=right | 2.3 km || 
|-id=773 bgcolor=#E9E9E9
| 109773 ||  || — || September 12, 2001 || Socorro || LINEAR || — || align=right | 1.6 km || 
|-id=774 bgcolor=#E9E9E9
| 109774 ||  || — || September 12, 2001 || Palomar || NEAT || — || align=right | 7.7 km || 
|-id=775 bgcolor=#E9E9E9
| 109775 ||  || — || September 14, 2001 || Palomar || NEAT || — || align=right | 2.1 km || 
|-id=776 bgcolor=#E9E9E9
| 109776 ||  || — || September 13, 2001 || Palomar || NEAT || — || align=right | 3.3 km || 
|-id=777 bgcolor=#E9E9E9
| 109777 ||  || — || September 14, 2001 || Ondřejov || P. Kušnirák || — || align=right | 3.3 km || 
|-id=778 bgcolor=#E9E9E9
| 109778 ||  || — || September 11, 2001 || Anderson Mesa || LONEOS || — || align=right | 1.6 km || 
|-id=779 bgcolor=#d6d6d6
| 109779 ||  || — || September 11, 2001 || Anderson Mesa || LONEOS || — || align=right | 7.1 km || 
|-id=780 bgcolor=#E9E9E9
| 109780 ||  || — || September 11, 2001 || Anderson Mesa || LONEOS || — || align=right | 1.8 km || 
|-id=781 bgcolor=#d6d6d6
| 109781 ||  || — || September 11, 2001 || Anderson Mesa || LONEOS || HYG || align=right | 5.6 km || 
|-id=782 bgcolor=#E9E9E9
| 109782 ||  || — || September 11, 2001 || Anderson Mesa || LONEOS || — || align=right | 4.9 km || 
|-id=783 bgcolor=#E9E9E9
| 109783 ||  || — || September 11, 2001 || Anderson Mesa || LONEOS || — || align=right | 2.5 km || 
|-id=784 bgcolor=#fefefe
| 109784 ||  || — || September 11, 2001 || Anderson Mesa || LONEOS || — || align=right | 2.6 km || 
|-id=785 bgcolor=#E9E9E9
| 109785 ||  || — || September 11, 2001 || Anderson Mesa || LONEOS || — || align=right | 3.1 km || 
|-id=786 bgcolor=#fefefe
| 109786 ||  || — || September 11, 2001 || Anderson Mesa || LONEOS || NYS || align=right | 2.0 km || 
|-id=787 bgcolor=#E9E9E9
| 109787 ||  || — || September 11, 2001 || Anderson Mesa || LONEOS || — || align=right | 2.2 km || 
|-id=788 bgcolor=#E9E9E9
| 109788 ||  || — || September 11, 2001 || Anderson Mesa || LONEOS || — || align=right | 1.9 km || 
|-id=789 bgcolor=#E9E9E9
| 109789 ||  || — || September 11, 2001 || Anderson Mesa || LONEOS || — || align=right | 2.4 km || 
|-id=790 bgcolor=#d6d6d6
| 109790 ||  || — || September 11, 2001 || Anderson Mesa || LONEOS || — || align=right | 6.4 km || 
|-id=791 bgcolor=#d6d6d6
| 109791 ||  || — || September 11, 2001 || Anderson Mesa || LONEOS || THM || align=right | 5.6 km || 
|-id=792 bgcolor=#E9E9E9
| 109792 ||  || — || September 11, 2001 || Anderson Mesa || LONEOS || MAR || align=right | 2.5 km || 
|-id=793 bgcolor=#E9E9E9
| 109793 ||  || — || September 11, 2001 || Anderson Mesa || LONEOS || — || align=right | 2.2 km || 
|-id=794 bgcolor=#E9E9E9
| 109794 ||  || — || September 11, 2001 || Anderson Mesa || LONEOS || — || align=right | 3.0 km || 
|-id=795 bgcolor=#d6d6d6
| 109795 ||  || — || September 11, 2001 || Anderson Mesa || LONEOS || — || align=right | 5.7 km || 
|-id=796 bgcolor=#E9E9E9
| 109796 ||  || — || September 11, 2001 || Anderson Mesa || LONEOS || — || align=right | 3.0 km || 
|-id=797 bgcolor=#d6d6d6
| 109797 ||  || — || September 11, 2001 || Anderson Mesa || LONEOS || YAK || align=right | 5.0 km || 
|-id=798 bgcolor=#E9E9E9
| 109798 ||  || — || September 11, 2001 || Anderson Mesa || LONEOS || — || align=right | 3.9 km || 
|-id=799 bgcolor=#d6d6d6
| 109799 ||  || — || September 11, 2001 || Anderson Mesa || LONEOS || HYG || align=right | 5.2 km || 
|-id=800 bgcolor=#d6d6d6
| 109800 ||  || — || September 11, 2001 || Anderson Mesa || LONEOS || THM || align=right | 6.1 km || 
|}

109801–109900 

|-bgcolor=#d6d6d6
| 109801 ||  || — || September 11, 2001 || Anderson Mesa || LONEOS || — || align=right | 5.0 km || 
|-id=802 bgcolor=#E9E9E9
| 109802 ||  || — || September 11, 2001 || Anderson Mesa || LONEOS || — || align=right | 5.2 km || 
|-id=803 bgcolor=#E9E9E9
| 109803 ||  || — || September 11, 2001 || Anderson Mesa || LONEOS || — || align=right | 2.6 km || 
|-id=804 bgcolor=#d6d6d6
| 109804 ||  || — || September 11, 2001 || Kitt Peak || Spacewatch || KOR || align=right | 2.4 km || 
|-id=805 bgcolor=#d6d6d6
| 109805 ||  || — || September 12, 2001 || Socorro || LINEAR || KOR || align=right | 2.8 km || 
|-id=806 bgcolor=#d6d6d6
| 109806 ||  || — || September 12, 2001 || Socorro || LINEAR || — || align=right | 5.0 km || 
|-id=807 bgcolor=#d6d6d6
| 109807 ||  || — || September 12, 2001 || Socorro || LINEAR || TEL || align=right | 2.6 km || 
|-id=808 bgcolor=#d6d6d6
| 109808 ||  || — || September 12, 2001 || Socorro || LINEAR || — || align=right | 5.4 km || 
|-id=809 bgcolor=#E9E9E9
| 109809 ||  || — || September 12, 2001 || Socorro || LINEAR || — || align=right | 2.3 km || 
|-id=810 bgcolor=#fefefe
| 109810 ||  || — || September 12, 2001 || Socorro || LINEAR || NYS || align=right | 1.4 km || 
|-id=811 bgcolor=#E9E9E9
| 109811 ||  || — || September 12, 2001 || Socorro || LINEAR || — || align=right | 4.3 km || 
|-id=812 bgcolor=#d6d6d6
| 109812 ||  || — || September 12, 2001 || Socorro || LINEAR || HYG || align=right | 5.5 km || 
|-id=813 bgcolor=#E9E9E9
| 109813 ||  || — || September 12, 2001 || Socorro || LINEAR || — || align=right | 2.9 km || 
|-id=814 bgcolor=#E9E9E9
| 109814 ||  || — || September 12, 2001 || Socorro || LINEAR || — || align=right | 2.2 km || 
|-id=815 bgcolor=#fefefe
| 109815 ||  || — || September 12, 2001 || Socorro || LINEAR || NYS || align=right | 1.2 km || 
|-id=816 bgcolor=#E9E9E9
| 109816 ||  || — || September 12, 2001 || Socorro || LINEAR || — || align=right | 2.5 km || 
|-id=817 bgcolor=#fefefe
| 109817 ||  || — || September 12, 2001 || Socorro || LINEAR || NYS || align=right | 2.0 km || 
|-id=818 bgcolor=#E9E9E9
| 109818 ||  || — || September 12, 2001 || Socorro || LINEAR || — || align=right | 2.0 km || 
|-id=819 bgcolor=#fefefe
| 109819 ||  || — || September 12, 2001 || Socorro || LINEAR || — || align=right | 1.3 km || 
|-id=820 bgcolor=#fefefe
| 109820 ||  || — || September 12, 2001 || Socorro || LINEAR || — || align=right | 1.3 km || 
|-id=821 bgcolor=#E9E9E9
| 109821 ||  || — || September 12, 2001 || Socorro || LINEAR || — || align=right | 1.5 km || 
|-id=822 bgcolor=#E9E9E9
| 109822 ||  || — || September 12, 2001 || Socorro || LINEAR || — || align=right | 3.1 km || 
|-id=823 bgcolor=#fefefe
| 109823 ||  || — || September 12, 2001 || Socorro || LINEAR || MAS || align=right | 1.6 km || 
|-id=824 bgcolor=#E9E9E9
| 109824 ||  || — || September 12, 2001 || Socorro || LINEAR || — || align=right | 2.7 km || 
|-id=825 bgcolor=#fefefe
| 109825 ||  || — || September 12, 2001 || Socorro || LINEAR || — || align=right | 1.8 km || 
|-id=826 bgcolor=#E9E9E9
| 109826 ||  || — || September 12, 2001 || Socorro || LINEAR || — || align=right | 2.0 km || 
|-id=827 bgcolor=#fefefe
| 109827 ||  || — || September 12, 2001 || Socorro || LINEAR || — || align=right | 1.4 km || 
|-id=828 bgcolor=#E9E9E9
| 109828 ||  || — || September 12, 2001 || Socorro || LINEAR || EUN || align=right | 1.7 km || 
|-id=829 bgcolor=#d6d6d6
| 109829 ||  || — || September 12, 2001 || Socorro || LINEAR || — || align=right | 6.0 km || 
|-id=830 bgcolor=#E9E9E9
| 109830 ||  || — || September 12, 2001 || Socorro || LINEAR || — || align=right | 2.1 km || 
|-id=831 bgcolor=#E9E9E9
| 109831 ||  || — || September 12, 2001 || Socorro || LINEAR || — || align=right | 1.5 km || 
|-id=832 bgcolor=#E9E9E9
| 109832 ||  || — || September 12, 2001 || Socorro || LINEAR || — || align=right | 2.0 km || 
|-id=833 bgcolor=#d6d6d6
| 109833 ||  || — || September 12, 2001 || Socorro || LINEAR || KOR || align=right | 2.7 km || 
|-id=834 bgcolor=#E9E9E9
| 109834 ||  || — || September 12, 2001 || Socorro || LINEAR || — || align=right | 2.5 km || 
|-id=835 bgcolor=#d6d6d6
| 109835 ||  || — || September 12, 2001 || Socorro || LINEAR || — || align=right | 5.9 km || 
|-id=836 bgcolor=#E9E9E9
| 109836 ||  || — || September 12, 2001 || Socorro || LINEAR || — || align=right | 1.4 km || 
|-id=837 bgcolor=#E9E9E9
| 109837 ||  || — || September 12, 2001 || Socorro || LINEAR || — || align=right | 3.7 km || 
|-id=838 bgcolor=#E9E9E9
| 109838 ||  || — || September 12, 2001 || Socorro || LINEAR || HEN || align=right | 2.5 km || 
|-id=839 bgcolor=#fefefe
| 109839 ||  || — || September 12, 2001 || Socorro || LINEAR || — || align=right | 3.1 km || 
|-id=840 bgcolor=#E9E9E9
| 109840 ||  || — || September 12, 2001 || Socorro || LINEAR || — || align=right | 2.7 km || 
|-id=841 bgcolor=#fefefe
| 109841 ||  || — || September 12, 2001 || Socorro || LINEAR || — || align=right | 1.4 km || 
|-id=842 bgcolor=#d6d6d6
| 109842 ||  || — || September 12, 2001 || Socorro || LINEAR || TEL || align=right | 2.7 km || 
|-id=843 bgcolor=#E9E9E9
| 109843 ||  || — || September 12, 2001 || Socorro || LINEAR || EUN || align=right | 1.8 km || 
|-id=844 bgcolor=#E9E9E9
| 109844 ||  || — || September 12, 2001 || Socorro || LINEAR || — || align=right | 2.5 km || 
|-id=845 bgcolor=#d6d6d6
| 109845 ||  || — || September 12, 2001 || Socorro || LINEAR || EOS || align=right | 4.3 km || 
|-id=846 bgcolor=#d6d6d6
| 109846 ||  || — || September 12, 2001 || Socorro || LINEAR || — || align=right | 5.7 km || 
|-id=847 bgcolor=#E9E9E9
| 109847 ||  || — || September 12, 2001 || Socorro || LINEAR || — || align=right | 1.5 km || 
|-id=848 bgcolor=#d6d6d6
| 109848 ||  || — || September 12, 2001 || Socorro || LINEAR || EOS || align=right | 3.5 km || 
|-id=849 bgcolor=#d6d6d6
| 109849 ||  || — || September 12, 2001 || Socorro || LINEAR || — || align=right | 5.3 km || 
|-id=850 bgcolor=#E9E9E9
| 109850 ||  || — || September 12, 2001 || Socorro || LINEAR || — || align=right | 2.6 km || 
|-id=851 bgcolor=#E9E9E9
| 109851 ||  || — || September 12, 2001 || Socorro || LINEAR || — || align=right | 2.0 km || 
|-id=852 bgcolor=#d6d6d6
| 109852 ||  || — || September 12, 2001 || Socorro || LINEAR || EMA || align=right | 3.8 km || 
|-id=853 bgcolor=#d6d6d6
| 109853 ||  || — || September 12, 2001 || Socorro || LINEAR || — || align=right | 4.8 km || 
|-id=854 bgcolor=#E9E9E9
| 109854 ||  || — || September 12, 2001 || Socorro || LINEAR || — || align=right | 2.6 km || 
|-id=855 bgcolor=#E9E9E9
| 109855 ||  || — || September 12, 2001 || Socorro || LINEAR || ADE || align=right | 5.6 km || 
|-id=856 bgcolor=#E9E9E9
| 109856 ||  || — || September 12, 2001 || Socorro || LINEAR || — || align=right | 2.7 km || 
|-id=857 bgcolor=#E9E9E9
| 109857 ||  || — || September 12, 2001 || Socorro || LINEAR || PAD || align=right | 3.4 km || 
|-id=858 bgcolor=#E9E9E9
| 109858 ||  || — || September 12, 2001 || Socorro || LINEAR || — || align=right | 3.0 km || 
|-id=859 bgcolor=#d6d6d6
| 109859 ||  || — || September 12, 2001 || Socorro || LINEAR || HYG || align=right | 5.0 km || 
|-id=860 bgcolor=#d6d6d6
| 109860 ||  || — || September 12, 2001 || Socorro || LINEAR || 7:4 || align=right | 6.5 km || 
|-id=861 bgcolor=#fefefe
| 109861 ||  || — || September 12, 2001 || Socorro || LINEAR || NYS || align=right | 3.3 km || 
|-id=862 bgcolor=#E9E9E9
| 109862 ||  || — || September 11, 2001 || Palomar || NEAT || INO || align=right | 2.7 km || 
|-id=863 bgcolor=#E9E9E9
| 109863 ||  || — || September 11, 2001 || Palomar || NEAT || — || align=right | 5.3 km || 
|-id=864 bgcolor=#E9E9E9
| 109864 ||  || — || September 15, 2001 || Palomar || NEAT || MAR || align=right | 2.9 km || 
|-id=865 bgcolor=#E9E9E9
| 109865 ||  || — || September 6, 2001 || Palomar || NEAT || HNS || align=right | 3.3 km || 
|-id=866 bgcolor=#E9E9E9
| 109866 ||  || — || September 9, 2001 || Socorro || LINEAR || — || align=right | 3.3 km || 
|-id=867 bgcolor=#E9E9E9
| 109867 ||  || — || September 9, 2001 || Anderson Mesa || LONEOS || JUN || align=right | 2.1 km || 
|-id=868 bgcolor=#fefefe
| 109868 ||  || — || September 10, 2001 || Anderson Mesa || LONEOS || — || align=right | 2.0 km || 
|-id=869 bgcolor=#d6d6d6
| 109869 ||  || — || September 10, 2001 || Palomar || NEAT || — || align=right | 4.4 km || 
|-id=870 bgcolor=#d6d6d6
| 109870 ||  || — || September 11, 2001 || Anderson Mesa || LONEOS || — || align=right | 5.6 km || 
|-id=871 bgcolor=#d6d6d6
| 109871 ||  || — || September 11, 2001 || Anderson Mesa || LONEOS || — || align=right | 7.0 km || 
|-id=872 bgcolor=#E9E9E9
| 109872 ||  || — || September 11, 2001 || Anderson Mesa || LONEOS || — || align=right | 2.1 km || 
|-id=873 bgcolor=#d6d6d6
| 109873 ||  || — || September 11, 2001 || Anderson Mesa || LONEOS || — || align=right | 4.4 km || 
|-id=874 bgcolor=#E9E9E9
| 109874 ||  || — || September 14, 2001 || Palomar || NEAT || — || align=right | 5.8 km || 
|-id=875 bgcolor=#E9E9E9
| 109875 ||  || — || September 14, 2001 || Palomar || NEAT || GEF || align=right | 2.7 km || 
|-id=876 bgcolor=#d6d6d6
| 109876 ||  || — || September 11, 2001 || Anderson Mesa || LONEOS || — || align=right | 7.7 km || 
|-id=877 bgcolor=#E9E9E9
| 109877 ||  || — || September 12, 2001 || Socorro || LINEAR || — || align=right | 1.6 km || 
|-id=878 bgcolor=#E9E9E9
| 109878 || 2001 SG || — || September 16, 2001 || Fountain Hills || C. W. Juels, P. R. Holvorcem || — || align=right | 2.4 km || 
|-id=879 bgcolor=#fefefe
| 109879 Letelier || 2001 SL ||  || September 16, 2001 || Fountain Hills || C. W. Juels, P. R. Holvorcem || — || align=right | 1.8 km || 
|-id=880 bgcolor=#E9E9E9
| 109880 || 2001 SZ || — || September 17, 2001 || Desert Eagle || W. K. Y. Yeung || — || align=right | 2.8 km || 
|-id=881 bgcolor=#d6d6d6
| 109881 ||  || — || September 17, 2001 || Desert Eagle || W. K. Y. Yeung || — || align=right | 5.0 km || 
|-id=882 bgcolor=#E9E9E9
| 109882 ||  || — || September 17, 2001 || Desert Eagle || W. K. Y. Yeung || — || align=right | 4.6 km || 
|-id=883 bgcolor=#E9E9E9
| 109883 ||  || — || September 18, 2001 || Fountain Hills || C. W. Juels, P. R. Holvorcem || — || align=right | 3.4 km || 
|-id=884 bgcolor=#E9E9E9
| 109884 ||  || — || September 18, 2001 || Kitt Peak || Spacewatch || — || align=right | 2.0 km || 
|-id=885 bgcolor=#d6d6d6
| 109885 ||  || — || September 18, 2001 || Kitt Peak || Spacewatch || — || align=right | 5.1 km || 
|-id=886 bgcolor=#E9E9E9
| 109886 ||  || — || September 19, 2001 || Fountain Hills || C. W. Juels, P. R. Holvorcem || — || align=right | 2.5 km || 
|-id=887 bgcolor=#E9E9E9
| 109887 ||  || — || September 18, 2001 || Desert Eagle || W. K. Y. Yeung || GEF || align=right | 2.5 km || 
|-id=888 bgcolor=#E9E9E9
| 109888 ||  || — || September 18, 2001 || Desert Eagle || W. K. Y. Yeung || — || align=right | 3.4 km || 
|-id=889 bgcolor=#E9E9E9
| 109889 ||  || — || September 20, 2001 || Desert Eagle || W. K. Y. Yeung || — || align=right | 1.6 km || 
|-id=890 bgcolor=#E9E9E9
| 109890 ||  || — || September 20, 2001 || Desert Eagle || W. K. Y. Yeung || HNA || align=right | 5.2 km || 
|-id=891 bgcolor=#d6d6d6
| 109891 ||  || — || September 16, 2001 || Socorro || LINEAR || — || align=right | 5.6 km || 
|-id=892 bgcolor=#d6d6d6
| 109892 ||  || — || September 16, 2001 || Socorro || LINEAR || — || align=right | 7.0 km || 
|-id=893 bgcolor=#E9E9E9
| 109893 ||  || — || September 16, 2001 || Socorro || LINEAR || — || align=right | 2.3 km || 
|-id=894 bgcolor=#E9E9E9
| 109894 ||  || — || September 16, 2001 || Socorro || LINEAR || — || align=right | 2.7 km || 
|-id=895 bgcolor=#E9E9E9
| 109895 ||  || — || September 16, 2001 || Socorro || LINEAR || MIS || align=right | 4.0 km || 
|-id=896 bgcolor=#E9E9E9
| 109896 ||  || — || September 16, 2001 || Socorro || LINEAR || — || align=right | 2.8 km || 
|-id=897 bgcolor=#E9E9E9
| 109897 ||  || — || September 16, 2001 || Socorro || LINEAR || — || align=right | 2.0 km || 
|-id=898 bgcolor=#d6d6d6
| 109898 ||  || — || September 16, 2001 || Socorro || LINEAR || — || align=right | 6.6 km || 
|-id=899 bgcolor=#d6d6d6
| 109899 ||  || — || September 16, 2001 || Socorro || LINEAR || — || align=right | 5.0 km || 
|-id=900 bgcolor=#E9E9E9
| 109900 ||  || — || September 16, 2001 || Socorro || LINEAR || HEN || align=right | 2.7 km || 
|}

109901–110000 

|-bgcolor=#E9E9E9
| 109901 ||  || — || September 16, 2001 || Socorro || LINEAR || HEN || align=right | 2.1 km || 
|-id=902 bgcolor=#E9E9E9
| 109902 ||  || — || September 16, 2001 || Socorro || LINEAR || — || align=right | 2.2 km || 
|-id=903 bgcolor=#E9E9E9
| 109903 ||  || — || September 16, 2001 || Socorro || LINEAR || PAD || align=right | 4.8 km || 
|-id=904 bgcolor=#E9E9E9
| 109904 ||  || — || September 16, 2001 || Socorro || LINEAR || — || align=right | 2.5 km || 
|-id=905 bgcolor=#E9E9E9
| 109905 ||  || — || September 16, 2001 || Socorro || LINEAR || — || align=right | 3.4 km || 
|-id=906 bgcolor=#fefefe
| 109906 ||  || — || September 16, 2001 || Socorro || LINEAR || — || align=right | 1.7 km || 
|-id=907 bgcolor=#fefefe
| 109907 ||  || — || September 16, 2001 || Socorro || LINEAR || NYS || align=right | 1.6 km || 
|-id=908 bgcolor=#E9E9E9
| 109908 ||  || — || September 16, 2001 || Socorro || LINEAR || — || align=right | 2.0 km || 
|-id=909 bgcolor=#E9E9E9
| 109909 ||  || — || September 16, 2001 || Socorro || LINEAR || GEF || align=right | 4.0 km || 
|-id=910 bgcolor=#E9E9E9
| 109910 ||  || — || September 16, 2001 || Socorro || LINEAR || WIT || align=right | 2.1 km || 
|-id=911 bgcolor=#d6d6d6
| 109911 ||  || — || September 16, 2001 || Socorro || LINEAR || THM || align=right | 5.7 km || 
|-id=912 bgcolor=#d6d6d6
| 109912 ||  || — || September 16, 2001 || Socorro || LINEAR || THM || align=right | 4.9 km || 
|-id=913 bgcolor=#E9E9E9
| 109913 ||  || — || September 16, 2001 || Socorro || LINEAR || — || align=right | 2.2 km || 
|-id=914 bgcolor=#E9E9E9
| 109914 ||  || — || September 16, 2001 || Socorro || LINEAR || ADE || align=right | 3.3 km || 
|-id=915 bgcolor=#E9E9E9
| 109915 ||  || — || September 16, 2001 || Socorro || LINEAR || — || align=right | 2.7 km || 
|-id=916 bgcolor=#E9E9E9
| 109916 ||  || — || September 16, 2001 || Socorro || LINEAR || — || align=right | 2.5 km || 
|-id=917 bgcolor=#d6d6d6
| 109917 ||  || — || September 16, 2001 || Socorro || LINEAR || — || align=right | 7.3 km || 
|-id=918 bgcolor=#d6d6d6
| 109918 ||  || — || September 16, 2001 || Socorro || LINEAR || — || align=right | 6.4 km || 
|-id=919 bgcolor=#d6d6d6
| 109919 ||  || — || September 16, 2001 || Socorro || LINEAR || — || align=right | 5.2 km || 
|-id=920 bgcolor=#E9E9E9
| 109920 ||  || — || September 16, 2001 || Socorro || LINEAR || — || align=right | 4.5 km || 
|-id=921 bgcolor=#E9E9E9
| 109921 ||  || — || September 16, 2001 || Socorro || LINEAR || — || align=right | 3.5 km || 
|-id=922 bgcolor=#E9E9E9
| 109922 ||  || — || September 16, 2001 || Socorro || LINEAR || — || align=right | 2.0 km || 
|-id=923 bgcolor=#d6d6d6
| 109923 ||  || — || September 16, 2001 || Socorro || LINEAR || — || align=right | 3.6 km || 
|-id=924 bgcolor=#E9E9E9
| 109924 ||  || — || September 16, 2001 || Socorro || LINEAR || EUN || align=right | 2.8 km || 
|-id=925 bgcolor=#E9E9E9
| 109925 ||  || — || September 16, 2001 || Socorro || LINEAR || — || align=right | 2.9 km || 
|-id=926 bgcolor=#E9E9E9
| 109926 ||  || — || September 16, 2001 || Socorro || LINEAR || — || align=right | 3.3 km || 
|-id=927 bgcolor=#E9E9E9
| 109927 ||  || — || September 16, 2001 || Socorro || LINEAR || — || align=right | 2.1 km || 
|-id=928 bgcolor=#E9E9E9
| 109928 ||  || — || September 16, 2001 || Socorro || LINEAR || — || align=right | 3.1 km || 
|-id=929 bgcolor=#d6d6d6
| 109929 ||  || — || September 16, 2001 || Socorro || LINEAR || — || align=right | 5.1 km || 
|-id=930 bgcolor=#d6d6d6
| 109930 ||  || — || September 16, 2001 || Socorro || LINEAR || EOS || align=right | 3.8 km || 
|-id=931 bgcolor=#E9E9E9
| 109931 ||  || — || September 16, 2001 || Socorro || LINEAR || — || align=right | 2.0 km || 
|-id=932 bgcolor=#d6d6d6
| 109932 ||  || — || September 16, 2001 || Socorro || LINEAR || — || align=right | 6.1 km || 
|-id=933 bgcolor=#E9E9E9
| 109933 ||  || — || September 16, 2001 || Socorro || LINEAR || EUN || align=right | 1.8 km || 
|-id=934 bgcolor=#d6d6d6
| 109934 ||  || — || September 16, 2001 || Socorro || LINEAR || THM || align=right | 5.1 km || 
|-id=935 bgcolor=#d6d6d6
| 109935 ||  || — || September 16, 2001 || Socorro || LINEAR || — || align=right | 7.7 km || 
|-id=936 bgcolor=#E9E9E9
| 109936 ||  || — || September 16, 2001 || Socorro || LINEAR || MAR || align=right | 2.2 km || 
|-id=937 bgcolor=#E9E9E9
| 109937 ||  || — || September 16, 2001 || Socorro || LINEAR || — || align=right | 2.3 km || 
|-id=938 bgcolor=#E9E9E9
| 109938 ||  || — || September 16, 2001 || Socorro || LINEAR || MRX || align=right | 2.7 km || 
|-id=939 bgcolor=#E9E9E9
| 109939 ||  || — || September 16, 2001 || Socorro || LINEAR || — || align=right | 2.4 km || 
|-id=940 bgcolor=#d6d6d6
| 109940 ||  || — || September 16, 2001 || Socorro || LINEAR || — || align=right | 5.4 km || 
|-id=941 bgcolor=#d6d6d6
| 109941 ||  || — || September 16, 2001 || Socorro || LINEAR || — || align=right | 5.3 km || 
|-id=942 bgcolor=#E9E9E9
| 109942 ||  || — || September 16, 2001 || Socorro || LINEAR || — || align=right | 3.9 km || 
|-id=943 bgcolor=#E9E9E9
| 109943 ||  || — || September 16, 2001 || Socorro || LINEAR || — || align=right | 2.1 km || 
|-id=944 bgcolor=#E9E9E9
| 109944 ||  || — || September 16, 2001 || Socorro || LINEAR || — || align=right | 1.7 km || 
|-id=945 bgcolor=#E9E9E9
| 109945 ||  || — || September 16, 2001 || Socorro || LINEAR || — || align=right | 3.9 km || 
|-id=946 bgcolor=#E9E9E9
| 109946 ||  || — || September 16, 2001 || Socorro || LINEAR || — || align=right | 4.9 km || 
|-id=947 bgcolor=#fefefe
| 109947 ||  || — || September 16, 2001 || Socorro || LINEAR || NYS || align=right | 1.5 km || 
|-id=948 bgcolor=#d6d6d6
| 109948 ||  || — || September 16, 2001 || Socorro || LINEAR || — || align=right | 5.7 km || 
|-id=949 bgcolor=#E9E9E9
| 109949 ||  || — || September 16, 2001 || Socorro || LINEAR || — || align=right | 4.4 km || 
|-id=950 bgcolor=#d6d6d6
| 109950 ||  || — || September 16, 2001 || Socorro || LINEAR || CRO || align=right | 8.2 km || 
|-id=951 bgcolor=#E9E9E9
| 109951 ||  || — || September 16, 2001 || Socorro || LINEAR || — || align=right | 4.6 km || 
|-id=952 bgcolor=#E9E9E9
| 109952 ||  || — || September 16, 2001 || Socorro || LINEAR || — || align=right | 6.0 km || 
|-id=953 bgcolor=#d6d6d6
| 109953 ||  || — || September 16, 2001 || Socorro || LINEAR || — || align=right | 7.5 km || 
|-id=954 bgcolor=#E9E9E9
| 109954 ||  || — || September 16, 2001 || Socorro || LINEAR || ADE || align=right | 3.9 km || 
|-id=955 bgcolor=#E9E9E9
| 109955 ||  || — || September 16, 2001 || Socorro || LINEAR || RAF || align=right | 1.7 km || 
|-id=956 bgcolor=#d6d6d6
| 109956 ||  || — || September 16, 2001 || Socorro || LINEAR || — || align=right | 6.4 km || 
|-id=957 bgcolor=#d6d6d6
| 109957 ||  || — || September 16, 2001 || Socorro || LINEAR || — || align=right | 5.3 km || 
|-id=958 bgcolor=#d6d6d6
| 109958 ||  || — || September 16, 2001 || Socorro || LINEAR || — || align=right | 4.9 km || 
|-id=959 bgcolor=#d6d6d6
| 109959 ||  || — || September 16, 2001 || Socorro || LINEAR || EOS || align=right | 3.7 km || 
|-id=960 bgcolor=#d6d6d6
| 109960 ||  || — || September 16, 2001 || Socorro || LINEAR || HYG || align=right | 5.8 km || 
|-id=961 bgcolor=#d6d6d6
| 109961 ||  || — || September 16, 2001 || Socorro || LINEAR || — || align=right | 6.1 km || 
|-id=962 bgcolor=#d6d6d6
| 109962 ||  || — || September 16, 2001 || Socorro || LINEAR || 3:2 || align=right | 8.0 km || 
|-id=963 bgcolor=#E9E9E9
| 109963 ||  || — || September 16, 2001 || Socorro || LINEAR || — || align=right | 3.8 km || 
|-id=964 bgcolor=#E9E9E9
| 109964 ||  || — || September 16, 2001 || Socorro || LINEAR || HNS || align=right | 2.1 km || 
|-id=965 bgcolor=#E9E9E9
| 109965 ||  || — || September 16, 2001 || Socorro || LINEAR || — || align=right | 5.4 km || 
|-id=966 bgcolor=#E9E9E9
| 109966 ||  || — || September 16, 2001 || Socorro || LINEAR || — || align=right | 5.3 km || 
|-id=967 bgcolor=#fefefe
| 109967 ||  || — || September 16, 2001 || Socorro || LINEAR || V || align=right | 1.9 km || 
|-id=968 bgcolor=#d6d6d6
| 109968 ||  || — || September 16, 2001 || Socorro || LINEAR || — || align=right | 4.4 km || 
|-id=969 bgcolor=#d6d6d6
| 109969 ||  || — || September 16, 2001 || Socorro || LINEAR || — || align=right | 6.4 km || 
|-id=970 bgcolor=#E9E9E9
| 109970 ||  || — || September 16, 2001 || Socorro || LINEAR || CLO || align=right | 4.5 km || 
|-id=971 bgcolor=#E9E9E9
| 109971 ||  || — || September 16, 2001 || Socorro || LINEAR || MRX || align=right | 1.8 km || 
|-id=972 bgcolor=#E9E9E9
| 109972 ||  || — || September 16, 2001 || Socorro || LINEAR || MAR || align=right | 2.0 km || 
|-id=973 bgcolor=#E9E9E9
| 109973 ||  || — || September 16, 2001 || Socorro || LINEAR || — || align=right | 2.9 km || 
|-id=974 bgcolor=#fefefe
| 109974 ||  || — || September 16, 2001 || Socorro || LINEAR || NYS || align=right | 1.7 km || 
|-id=975 bgcolor=#E9E9E9
| 109975 ||  || — || September 16, 2001 || Socorro || LINEAR || — || align=right | 2.0 km || 
|-id=976 bgcolor=#E9E9E9
| 109976 ||  || — || September 16, 2001 || Socorro || LINEAR || — || align=right | 1.8 km || 
|-id=977 bgcolor=#E9E9E9
| 109977 ||  || — || September 16, 2001 || Socorro || LINEAR || — || align=right | 2.9 km || 
|-id=978 bgcolor=#d6d6d6
| 109978 ||  || — || September 16, 2001 || Socorro || LINEAR || HYGslow || align=right | 6.7 km || 
|-id=979 bgcolor=#d6d6d6
| 109979 ||  || — || September 16, 2001 || Socorro || LINEAR || — || align=right | 6.1 km || 
|-id=980 bgcolor=#d6d6d6
| 109980 ||  || — || September 16, 2001 || Socorro || LINEAR || — || align=right | 5.2 km || 
|-id=981 bgcolor=#E9E9E9
| 109981 ||  || — || September 16, 2001 || Socorro || LINEAR || — || align=right | 2.9 km || 
|-id=982 bgcolor=#E9E9E9
| 109982 ||  || — || September 16, 2001 || Socorro || LINEAR || — || align=right | 4.1 km || 
|-id=983 bgcolor=#E9E9E9
| 109983 ||  || — || September 16, 2001 || Socorro || LINEAR || EUN || align=right | 3.2 km || 
|-id=984 bgcolor=#E9E9E9
| 109984 ||  || — || September 16, 2001 || Socorro || LINEAR || JUN || align=right | 2.0 km || 
|-id=985 bgcolor=#E9E9E9
| 109985 ||  || — || September 16, 2001 || Socorro || LINEAR || — || align=right | 4.3 km || 
|-id=986 bgcolor=#E9E9E9
| 109986 ||  || — || September 16, 2001 || Socorro || LINEAR || BRG || align=right | 2.7 km || 
|-id=987 bgcolor=#E9E9E9
| 109987 ||  || — || September 17, 2001 || Socorro || LINEAR || — || align=right | 4.7 km || 
|-id=988 bgcolor=#E9E9E9
| 109988 ||  || — || September 17, 2001 || Socorro || LINEAR || — || align=right | 1.7 km || 
|-id=989 bgcolor=#d6d6d6
| 109989 ||  || — || September 17, 2001 || Socorro || LINEAR || HYG || align=right | 5.4 km || 
|-id=990 bgcolor=#d6d6d6
| 109990 ||  || — || September 17, 2001 || Socorro || LINEAR || — || align=right | 7.4 km || 
|-id=991 bgcolor=#E9E9E9
| 109991 ||  || — || September 17, 2001 || Socorro || LINEAR || MAR || align=right | 1.5 km || 
|-id=992 bgcolor=#E9E9E9
| 109992 ||  || — || September 17, 2001 || Socorro || LINEAR || — || align=right | 2.3 km || 
|-id=993 bgcolor=#E9E9E9
| 109993 ||  || — || September 17, 2001 || Socorro || LINEAR || — || align=right | 2.2 km || 
|-id=994 bgcolor=#E9E9E9
| 109994 ||  || — || September 17, 2001 || Socorro || LINEAR || — || align=right | 2.2 km || 
|-id=995 bgcolor=#E9E9E9
| 109995 ||  || — || September 17, 2001 || Socorro || LINEAR || — || align=right | 2.2 km || 
|-id=996 bgcolor=#d6d6d6
| 109996 ||  || — || September 17, 2001 || Socorro || LINEAR || — || align=right | 5.9 km || 
|-id=997 bgcolor=#E9E9E9
| 109997 ||  || — || September 17, 2001 || Socorro || LINEAR || — || align=right | 2.3 km || 
|-id=998 bgcolor=#E9E9E9
| 109998 ||  || — || September 17, 2001 || Socorro || LINEAR || — || align=right | 2.4 km || 
|-id=999 bgcolor=#d6d6d6
| 109999 ||  || — || September 17, 2001 || Socorro || LINEAR || — || align=right | 6.9 km || 
|-id=000 bgcolor=#E9E9E9
| 110000 ||  || — || September 17, 2001 || Socorro || LINEAR || — || align=right | 2.0 km || 
|}

References

External links 
 Discovery Circumstances: Numbered Minor Planets (105001)–(110000) (IAU Minor Planet Center)

0109